

417001–417100 

|-bgcolor=#E9E9E9
| 417001 ||  || — || October 6, 2005 || Anderson Mesa || LONEOS || EUN || align=right | 1.3 km || 
|-id=002 bgcolor=#E9E9E9
| 417002 ||  || — || September 24, 2005 || Kitt Peak || Spacewatch || — || align=right | 1.6 km || 
|-id=003 bgcolor=#E9E9E9
| 417003 ||  || — || October 13, 2005 || Kitt Peak || Spacewatch || — || align=right | 1.2 km || 
|-id=004 bgcolor=#E9E9E9
| 417004 ||  || — || October 1, 2005 || Mount Lemmon || Mount Lemmon Survey || — || align=right | 1.8 km || 
|-id=005 bgcolor=#E9E9E9
| 417005 ||  || — || October 23, 2005 || Catalina || CSS || — || align=right | 2.7 km || 
|-id=006 bgcolor=#E9E9E9
| 417006 ||  || — || October 25, 2005 || Socorro || LINEAR || — || align=right | 3.4 km || 
|-id=007 bgcolor=#E9E9E9
| 417007 ||  || — || August 30, 2005 || Socorro || LINEAR || — || align=right | 2.2 km || 
|-id=008 bgcolor=#E9E9E9
| 417008 ||  || — || October 22, 2005 || Kitt Peak || Spacewatch || — || align=right | 1.7 km || 
|-id=009 bgcolor=#E9E9E9
| 417009 ||  || — || October 23, 2005 || Kitt Peak || Spacewatch || — || align=right | 2.3 km || 
|-id=010 bgcolor=#E9E9E9
| 417010 ||  || — || October 24, 2005 || Kitt Peak || Spacewatch || — || align=right | 1.6 km || 
|-id=011 bgcolor=#E9E9E9
| 417011 ||  || — || October 24, 2005 || Kitt Peak || Spacewatch || — || align=right | 1.5 km || 
|-id=012 bgcolor=#E9E9E9
| 417012 ||  || — || October 24, 2005 || Kitt Peak || Spacewatch || HOF || align=right | 2.5 km || 
|-id=013 bgcolor=#E9E9E9
| 417013 ||  || — || October 22, 2005 || Kitt Peak || Spacewatch || — || align=right | 2.9 km || 
|-id=014 bgcolor=#E9E9E9
| 417014 ||  || — || October 22, 2005 || Kitt Peak || Spacewatch || — || align=right | 2.0 km || 
|-id=015 bgcolor=#E9E9E9
| 417015 ||  || — || October 22, 2005 || Kitt Peak || Spacewatch || — || align=right | 1.5 km || 
|-id=016 bgcolor=#E9E9E9
| 417016 ||  || — || October 1, 2005 || Mount Lemmon || Mount Lemmon Survey || — || align=right | 2.7 km || 
|-id=017 bgcolor=#E9E9E9
| 417017 ||  || — || October 23, 2005 || Catalina || CSS || — || align=right | 1.3 km || 
|-id=018 bgcolor=#E9E9E9
| 417018 ||  || — || October 24, 2005 || Kitt Peak || Spacewatch || — || align=right | 1.3 km || 
|-id=019 bgcolor=#E9E9E9
| 417019 ||  || — || October 25, 2005 || Anderson Mesa || LONEOS || — || align=right | 1.6 km || 
|-id=020 bgcolor=#E9E9E9
| 417020 ||  || — || October 29, 2005 || Wrightwood || J. W. Young || — || align=right | 1.6 km || 
|-id=021 bgcolor=#E9E9E9
| 417021 ||  || — || October 23, 2005 || Palomar || NEAT || — || align=right | 1.9 km || 
|-id=022 bgcolor=#E9E9E9
| 417022 ||  || — || October 25, 2005 || Mount Lemmon || Mount Lemmon Survey || — || align=right | 2.3 km || 
|-id=023 bgcolor=#E9E9E9
| 417023 ||  || — || October 22, 2005 || Kitt Peak || Spacewatch ||  || align=right | 1.2 km || 
|-id=024 bgcolor=#E9E9E9
| 417024 ||  || — || October 22, 2005 || Kitt Peak || Spacewatch || — || align=right | 1.5 km || 
|-id=025 bgcolor=#E9E9E9
| 417025 ||  || — || October 22, 2005 || Kitt Peak || Spacewatch || — || align=right | 1.2 km || 
|-id=026 bgcolor=#E9E9E9
| 417026 ||  || — || October 22, 2005 || Kitt Peak || Spacewatch || MIS || align=right | 2.3 km || 
|-id=027 bgcolor=#E9E9E9
| 417027 ||  || — || October 22, 2005 || Kitt Peak || Spacewatch || WIT || align=right | 1.0 km || 
|-id=028 bgcolor=#E9E9E9
| 417028 ||  || — || October 22, 2005 || Kitt Peak || Spacewatch || — || align=right | 1.8 km || 
|-id=029 bgcolor=#E9E9E9
| 417029 ||  || — || March 26, 2003 || Anderson Mesa || LONEOS || GEF || align=right | 1.7 km || 
|-id=030 bgcolor=#E9E9E9
| 417030 ||  || — || October 22, 2005 || Kitt Peak || Spacewatch || — || align=right | 1.8 km || 
|-id=031 bgcolor=#E9E9E9
| 417031 ||  || — || October 22, 2005 || Kitt Peak || Spacewatch || — || align=right | 1.4 km || 
|-id=032 bgcolor=#E9E9E9
| 417032 ||  || — || October 22, 2005 || Kitt Peak || Spacewatch || AGN || align=right | 1.2 km || 
|-id=033 bgcolor=#E9E9E9
| 417033 ||  || — || October 22, 2005 || Kitt Peak || Spacewatch || — || align=right | 2.1 km || 
|-id=034 bgcolor=#E9E9E9
| 417034 ||  || — || October 22, 2005 || Kitt Peak || Spacewatch || EUN || align=right | 1.3 km || 
|-id=035 bgcolor=#E9E9E9
| 417035 ||  || — || October 22, 2005 || Kitt Peak || Spacewatch || — || align=right | 1.4 km || 
|-id=036 bgcolor=#E9E9E9
| 417036 ||  || — || October 22, 2005 || Kitt Peak || Spacewatch || — || align=right | 2.0 km || 
|-id=037 bgcolor=#E9E9E9
| 417037 ||  || — || October 22, 2005 || Palomar || NEAT || — || align=right | 1.7 km || 
|-id=038 bgcolor=#E9E9E9
| 417038 ||  || — || October 23, 2005 || Palomar || NEAT || — || align=right | 1.6 km || 
|-id=039 bgcolor=#E9E9E9
| 417039 ||  || — || October 23, 2005 || Catalina || CSS || — || align=right | 1.6 km || 
|-id=040 bgcolor=#E9E9E9
| 417040 ||  || — || October 5, 2005 || Kitt Peak || Spacewatch || — || align=right | 1.4 km || 
|-id=041 bgcolor=#E9E9E9
| 417041 ||  || — || October 24, 2005 || Kitt Peak || Spacewatch || — || align=right | 1.2 km || 
|-id=042 bgcolor=#E9E9E9
| 417042 ||  || — || October 24, 2005 || Kitt Peak || Spacewatch || — || align=right | 2.9 km || 
|-id=043 bgcolor=#E9E9E9
| 417043 ||  || — || October 24, 2005 || Kitt Peak || Spacewatch || — || align=right | 1.6 km || 
|-id=044 bgcolor=#E9E9E9
| 417044 ||  || — || October 24, 2005 || Kitt Peak || Spacewatch || — || align=right | 1.2 km || 
|-id=045 bgcolor=#E9E9E9
| 417045 ||  || — || October 24, 2005 || Kitt Peak || Spacewatch || — || align=right | 2.4 km || 
|-id=046 bgcolor=#E9E9E9
| 417046 ||  || — || October 25, 2005 || Mount Lemmon || Mount Lemmon Survey || — || align=right | 1.3 km || 
|-id=047 bgcolor=#fefefe
| 417047 ||  || — || October 26, 2005 || Kitt Peak || Spacewatch || — || align=right data-sort-value="0.85" | 850 m || 
|-id=048 bgcolor=#E9E9E9
| 417048 ||  || — || October 26, 2005 || Palomar || NEAT || — || align=right | 2.6 km || 
|-id=049 bgcolor=#E9E9E9
| 417049 ||  || — || October 1, 2005 || Mount Lemmon || Mount Lemmon Survey || — || align=right | 2.8 km || 
|-id=050 bgcolor=#E9E9E9
| 417050 ||  || — || October 22, 2005 || Palomar || NEAT || — || align=right | 1.7 km || 
|-id=051 bgcolor=#E9E9E9
| 417051 ||  || — || October 12, 2005 || Kitt Peak || Spacewatch || — || align=right | 1.3 km || 
|-id=052 bgcolor=#E9E9E9
| 417052 ||  || — || October 24, 2005 || Kitt Peak || Spacewatch || ADE || align=right | 2.9 km || 
|-id=053 bgcolor=#E9E9E9
| 417053 ||  || — || October 24, 2005 || Kitt Peak || Spacewatch || — || align=right | 1.3 km || 
|-id=054 bgcolor=#E9E9E9
| 417054 ||  || — || October 24, 2005 || Kitt Peak || Spacewatch || — || align=right | 2.1 km || 
|-id=055 bgcolor=#E9E9E9
| 417055 ||  || — || October 25, 2005 || Mount Lemmon || Mount Lemmon Survey || — || align=right | 1.8 km || 
|-id=056 bgcolor=#E9E9E9
| 417056 ||  || — || October 27, 2005 || Kitt Peak || Spacewatch || — || align=right | 2.2 km || 
|-id=057 bgcolor=#E9E9E9
| 417057 ||  || — || October 22, 2005 || Kitt Peak || Spacewatch || — || align=right | 1.3 km || 
|-id=058 bgcolor=#E9E9E9
| 417058 ||  || — || October 22, 2005 || Kitt Peak || Spacewatch || PAD || align=right | 1.5 km || 
|-id=059 bgcolor=#E9E9E9
| 417059 ||  || — || October 25, 2005 || Kitt Peak || Spacewatch || — || align=right | 1.8 km || 
|-id=060 bgcolor=#E9E9E9
| 417060 ||  || — || October 26, 2005 || Kitt Peak || Spacewatch || MRX || align=right data-sort-value="0.98" | 980 m || 
|-id=061 bgcolor=#E9E9E9
| 417061 ||  || — || October 27, 2005 || Mount Lemmon || Mount Lemmon Survey || — || align=right | 2.1 km || 
|-id=062 bgcolor=#E9E9E9
| 417062 ||  || — || October 27, 2005 || Kitt Peak || Spacewatch || AGN || align=right | 1.1 km || 
|-id=063 bgcolor=#E9E9E9
| 417063 ||  || — || October 25, 2005 || Kitt Peak || Spacewatch || — || align=right | 1.6 km || 
|-id=064 bgcolor=#E9E9E9
| 417064 ||  || — || October 25, 2005 || Kitt Peak || Spacewatch || — || align=right | 2.5 km || 
|-id=065 bgcolor=#E9E9E9
| 417065 ||  || — || October 25, 2005 || Kitt Peak || Spacewatch || NEM || align=right | 2.3 km || 
|-id=066 bgcolor=#E9E9E9
| 417066 ||  || — || October 25, 2005 || Kitt Peak || Spacewatch || — || align=right | 1.3 km || 
|-id=067 bgcolor=#E9E9E9
| 417067 ||  || — || October 25, 2005 || Kitt Peak || Spacewatch || — || align=right | 2.0 km || 
|-id=068 bgcolor=#E9E9E9
| 417068 ||  || — || October 25, 2005 || Kitt Peak || Spacewatch || — || align=right | 1.7 km || 
|-id=069 bgcolor=#E9E9E9
| 417069 ||  || — || October 25, 2005 || Kitt Peak || Spacewatch || — || align=right | 1.5 km || 
|-id=070 bgcolor=#E9E9E9
| 417070 ||  || — || October 25, 2005 || Kitt Peak || Spacewatch || — || align=right | 1.2 km || 
|-id=071 bgcolor=#E9E9E9
| 417071 ||  || — || February 9, 2002 || Kitt Peak || Spacewatch || — || align=right | 1.5 km || 
|-id=072 bgcolor=#E9E9E9
| 417072 ||  || — || October 25, 2005 || Mount Lemmon || Mount Lemmon Survey || — || align=right | 1.6 km || 
|-id=073 bgcolor=#E9E9E9
| 417073 ||  || — || October 25, 2005 || Kitt Peak || Spacewatch || — || align=right | 2.3 km || 
|-id=074 bgcolor=#E9E9E9
| 417074 ||  || — || October 25, 2005 || Kitt Peak || Spacewatch || — || align=right | 2.3 km || 
|-id=075 bgcolor=#E9E9E9
| 417075 ||  || — || October 25, 2005 || Kitt Peak || Spacewatch || EUN || align=right | 1.3 km || 
|-id=076 bgcolor=#E9E9E9
| 417076 ||  || — || October 25, 2005 || Kitt Peak || Spacewatch || — || align=right | 1.9 km || 
|-id=077 bgcolor=#E9E9E9
| 417077 ||  || — || October 28, 2005 || Kitt Peak || Spacewatch || — || align=right | 2.4 km || 
|-id=078 bgcolor=#E9E9E9
| 417078 ||  || — || October 24, 2005 || Kitt Peak || Spacewatch || — || align=right | 2.2 km || 
|-id=079 bgcolor=#E9E9E9
| 417079 ||  || — || October 25, 2005 || Kitt Peak || Spacewatch || WIT || align=right | 1.1 km || 
|-id=080 bgcolor=#E9E9E9
| 417080 ||  || — || October 25, 2005 || Kitt Peak || Spacewatch || — || align=right | 1.1 km || 
|-id=081 bgcolor=#E9E9E9
| 417081 ||  || — || October 25, 2005 || Kitt Peak || Spacewatch || — || align=right | 1.9 km || 
|-id=082 bgcolor=#E9E9E9
| 417082 ||  || — || October 1, 2005 || Kitt Peak || Spacewatch || — || align=right | 1.3 km || 
|-id=083 bgcolor=#E9E9E9
| 417083 ||  || — || March 26, 2003 || Kitt Peak || Spacewatch || — || align=right | 1.5 km || 
|-id=084 bgcolor=#E9E9E9
| 417084 ||  || — || October 27, 2005 || Mount Lemmon || Mount Lemmon Survey || — || align=right | 1.9 km || 
|-id=085 bgcolor=#E9E9E9
| 417085 ||  || — || October 24, 2005 || Palomar || NEAT || EUN || align=right | 1.3 km || 
|-id=086 bgcolor=#E9E9E9
| 417086 ||  || — || October 26, 2005 || Kitt Peak || Spacewatch || — || align=right | 2.3 km || 
|-id=087 bgcolor=#E9E9E9
| 417087 ||  || — || October 26, 2005 || Kitt Peak || Spacewatch || AGN || align=right | 1.2 km || 
|-id=088 bgcolor=#E9E9E9
| 417088 ||  || — || October 26, 2005 || Kitt Peak || Spacewatch || — || align=right | 2.3 km || 
|-id=089 bgcolor=#E9E9E9
| 417089 ||  || — || October 26, 2005 || Kitt Peak || Spacewatch || — || align=right | 1.3 km || 
|-id=090 bgcolor=#E9E9E9
| 417090 ||  || — || October 26, 2005 || Kitt Peak || Spacewatch || — || align=right | 1.5 km || 
|-id=091 bgcolor=#E9E9E9
| 417091 ||  || — || October 27, 2005 || Mount Lemmon || Mount Lemmon Survey || — || align=right | 1.6 km || 
|-id=092 bgcolor=#E9E9E9
| 417092 ||  || — || September 25, 2005 || Kitt Peak || Spacewatch ||  || align=right | 1.2 km || 
|-id=093 bgcolor=#fefefe
| 417093 ||  || — || October 28, 2005 || Socorro || LINEAR || — || align=right data-sort-value="0.96" | 960 m || 
|-id=094 bgcolor=#E9E9E9
| 417094 ||  || — || October 27, 2005 || Kitt Peak || Spacewatch || — || align=right | 1.8 km || 
|-id=095 bgcolor=#E9E9E9
| 417095 ||  || — || October 25, 2005 || Kitt Peak || Spacewatch || NEM || align=right | 2.3 km || 
|-id=096 bgcolor=#E9E9E9
| 417096 ||  || — || October 31, 2005 || Kitt Peak || Spacewatch || — || align=right | 1.1 km || 
|-id=097 bgcolor=#E9E9E9
| 417097 ||  || — || October 30, 2005 || Kitt Peak || Spacewatch || — || align=right | 1.6 km || 
|-id=098 bgcolor=#E9E9E9
| 417098 ||  || — || October 24, 2005 || Kitt Peak || Spacewatch || (1547) || align=right | 1.3 km || 
|-id=099 bgcolor=#E9E9E9
| 417099 ||  || — || October 25, 2005 || Mount Lemmon || Mount Lemmon Survey || — || align=right | 1.3 km || 
|-id=100 bgcolor=#E9E9E9
| 417100 ||  || — || October 27, 2005 || Kitt Peak || Spacewatch || — || align=right | 1.9 km || 
|}

417101–417200 

|-bgcolor=#E9E9E9
| 417101 ||  || — || October 27, 2005 || Kitt Peak || Spacewatch || — || align=right | 1.3 km || 
|-id=102 bgcolor=#E9E9E9
| 417102 ||  || — || September 30, 2005 || Mount Lemmon || Mount Lemmon Survey || (1547) || align=right | 1.2 km || 
|-id=103 bgcolor=#E9E9E9
| 417103 ||  || — || October 27, 2005 || Kitt Peak || Spacewatch || — || align=right | 2.0 km || 
|-id=104 bgcolor=#E9E9E9
| 417104 ||  || — || October 1, 2005 || Anderson Mesa || LONEOS || ADE || align=right | 2.2 km || 
|-id=105 bgcolor=#E9E9E9
| 417105 ||  || — || October 30, 2005 || Kitt Peak || Spacewatch || HOF || align=right | 2.2 km || 
|-id=106 bgcolor=#E9E9E9
| 417106 ||  || — || October 30, 2005 || Mount Lemmon || Mount Lemmon Survey || — || align=right | 1.7 km || 
|-id=107 bgcolor=#E9E9E9
| 417107 ||  || — || October 24, 2005 || Kitt Peak || Spacewatch || EUN || align=right | 1.4 km || 
|-id=108 bgcolor=#E9E9E9
| 417108 ||  || — || October 28, 2005 || Kitt Peak || Spacewatch || — || align=right | 2.5 km || 
|-id=109 bgcolor=#E9E9E9
| 417109 ||  || — || October 28, 2005 || Kitt Peak || Spacewatch || — || align=right | 1.9 km || 
|-id=110 bgcolor=#E9E9E9
| 417110 ||  || — || October 28, 2005 || Kitt Peak || Spacewatch || — || align=right | 2.3 km || 
|-id=111 bgcolor=#E9E9E9
| 417111 ||  || — || October 29, 2005 || Kitt Peak || Spacewatch || — || align=right | 1.4 km || 
|-id=112 bgcolor=#E9E9E9
| 417112 ||  || — || October 1, 2005 || Catalina || CSS || — || align=right | 2.0 km || 
|-id=113 bgcolor=#E9E9E9
| 417113 ||  || — || October 30, 2005 || Kitt Peak || Spacewatch || — || align=right | 2.1 km || 
|-id=114 bgcolor=#E9E9E9
| 417114 ||  || — || October 29, 2005 || Kitt Peak || Spacewatch || NEM || align=right | 2.1 km || 
|-id=115 bgcolor=#E9E9E9
| 417115 ||  || — || October 25, 2005 || Mount Lemmon || Mount Lemmon Survey || — || align=right | 1.5 km || 
|-id=116 bgcolor=#E9E9E9
| 417116 ||  || — || September 3, 2005 || Palomar || NEAT || — || align=right | 1.5 km || 
|-id=117 bgcolor=#E9E9E9
| 417117 ||  || — || October 10, 2005 || Catalina || CSS || — || align=right | 1.4 km || 
|-id=118 bgcolor=#E9E9E9
| 417118 ||  || — || October 23, 2005 || Catalina || CSS || — || align=right | 2.7 km || 
|-id=119 bgcolor=#E9E9E9
| 417119 ||  || — || October 26, 2005 || Anderson Mesa || LONEOS || — || align=right | 1.9 km || 
|-id=120 bgcolor=#E9E9E9
| 417120 ||  || — || October 5, 2005 || Catalina || CSS || — || align=right | 1.7 km || 
|-id=121 bgcolor=#E9E9E9
| 417121 ||  || — || October 27, 2005 || Catalina || CSS || EUN || align=right | 1.4 km || 
|-id=122 bgcolor=#E9E9E9
| 417122 ||  || — || October 27, 2005 || Catalina || CSS ||  || align=right | 2.6 km || 
|-id=123 bgcolor=#E9E9E9
| 417123 ||  || — || October 21, 2005 || Palomar || NEAT || — || align=right | 1.4 km || 
|-id=124 bgcolor=#E9E9E9
| 417124 ||  || — || October 30, 2005 || Mount Lemmon || Mount Lemmon Survey || EUN || align=right | 1.6 km || 
|-id=125 bgcolor=#E9E9E9
| 417125 ||  || — || October 31, 2005 || Catalina || CSS || ADE || align=right | 2.4 km || 
|-id=126 bgcolor=#E9E9E9
| 417126 ||  || — || October 25, 2005 || Mount Lemmon || Mount Lemmon Survey || — || align=right | 2.3 km || 
|-id=127 bgcolor=#E9E9E9
| 417127 ||  || — || October 25, 2005 || Kitt Peak || Spacewatch || — || align=right | 2.0 km || 
|-id=128 bgcolor=#E9E9E9
| 417128 ||  || — || October 27, 2005 || Mount Lemmon || Mount Lemmon Survey || — || align=right | 1.1 km || 
|-id=129 bgcolor=#E9E9E9
| 417129 || 2005 VG || — || November 2, 2005 || Cordell-Lorenz || D. T. Durig || EUN || align=right | 1.3 km || 
|-id=130 bgcolor=#E9E9E9
| 417130 ||  || — || November 7, 2005 || Ottmarsheim || C. Rinner || — || align=right | 2.0 km || 
|-id=131 bgcolor=#E9E9E9
| 417131 ||  || — || November 1, 2005 || Kitt Peak || Spacewatch || — || align=right | 1.8 km || 
|-id=132 bgcolor=#E9E9E9
| 417132 ||  || — || November 2, 2005 || Mount Lemmon || Mount Lemmon Survey || — || align=right | 1.7 km || 
|-id=133 bgcolor=#E9E9E9
| 417133 ||  || — || November 3, 2005 || Mount Lemmon || Mount Lemmon Survey || HOF || align=right | 2.7 km || 
|-id=134 bgcolor=#E9E9E9
| 417134 ||  || — || November 3, 2005 || Kitt Peak || Spacewatch || critical || align=right data-sort-value="0.86" | 860 m || 
|-id=135 bgcolor=#E9E9E9
| 417135 ||  || — || October 25, 2005 || Kitt Peak || Spacewatch || — || align=right | 1.4 km || 
|-id=136 bgcolor=#E9E9E9
| 417136 ||  || — || November 5, 2005 || Kitt Peak || Spacewatch || — || align=right | 2.3 km || 
|-id=137 bgcolor=#E9E9E9
| 417137 ||  || — || November 1, 2005 || Mount Lemmon || Mount Lemmon Survey || HOF || align=right | 2.5 km || 
|-id=138 bgcolor=#E9E9E9
| 417138 ||  || — || November 1, 2005 || Mount Lemmon || Mount Lemmon Survey || — || align=right | 2.9 km || 
|-id=139 bgcolor=#E9E9E9
| 417139 ||  || — || November 1, 2005 || Mount Lemmon || Mount Lemmon Survey || ADE || align=right | 1.9 km || 
|-id=140 bgcolor=#E9E9E9
| 417140 ||  || — || November 3, 2005 || Socorro || LINEAR || — || align=right | 1.5 km || 
|-id=141 bgcolor=#E9E9E9
| 417141 ||  || — || November 5, 2005 || Kitt Peak || Spacewatch || EUN || align=right | 1.5 km || 
|-id=142 bgcolor=#E9E9E9
| 417142 ||  || — || November 3, 2005 || Mount Lemmon || Mount Lemmon Survey || ADE || align=right | 2.3 km || 
|-id=143 bgcolor=#E9E9E9
| 417143 ||  || — || October 30, 2005 || Mount Lemmon || Mount Lemmon Survey || — || align=right | 2.1 km || 
|-id=144 bgcolor=#E9E9E9
| 417144 ||  || — || November 6, 2005 || Kitt Peak || Spacewatch || — || align=right | 1.6 km || 
|-id=145 bgcolor=#E9E9E9
| 417145 ||  || — || November 6, 2005 || Mount Lemmon || Mount Lemmon Survey || 526 || align=right | 2.6 km || 
|-id=146 bgcolor=#E9E9E9
| 417146 ||  || — || November 3, 2005 || Kitt Peak || Spacewatch || — || align=right | 1.6 km || 
|-id=147 bgcolor=#E9E9E9
| 417147 ||  || — || October 25, 2005 || Kitt Peak || Spacewatch || AGN || align=right | 1.2 km || 
|-id=148 bgcolor=#E9E9E9
| 417148 ||  || — || October 25, 2005 || Kitt Peak || Spacewatch || — || align=right | 1.8 km || 
|-id=149 bgcolor=#E9E9E9
| 417149 ||  || — || November 6, 2005 || Mount Lemmon || Mount Lemmon Survey || AGN || align=right | 1.0 km || 
|-id=150 bgcolor=#E9E9E9
| 417150 ||  || — || November 10, 2005 || Mount Lemmon || Mount Lemmon Survey || — || align=right | 2.8 km || 
|-id=151 bgcolor=#E9E9E9
| 417151 ||  || — || November 11, 2005 || Kitt Peak || Spacewatch || — || align=right | 1.4 km || 
|-id=152 bgcolor=#E9E9E9
| 417152 ||  || — || November 11, 2005 || Kitt Peak || Spacewatch || GEF || align=right | 1.1 km || 
|-id=153 bgcolor=#d6d6d6
| 417153 ||  || — || November 7, 2005 || Mauna Kea || Mauna Kea Obs. || — || align=right | 2.2 km || 
|-id=154 bgcolor=#E9E9E9
| 417154 ||  || — || November 20, 2005 || Catalina || CSS || — || align=right | 2.0 km || 
|-id=155 bgcolor=#E9E9E9
| 417155 ||  || — || October 25, 2005 || Mount Lemmon || Mount Lemmon Survey || AGN || align=right | 1.1 km || 
|-id=156 bgcolor=#E9E9E9
| 417156 ||  || — || November 21, 2005 || Kitt Peak || Spacewatch || — || align=right | 2.3 km || 
|-id=157 bgcolor=#d6d6d6
| 417157 ||  || — || October 30, 2005 || Mount Lemmon || Mount Lemmon Survey || 3:2 || align=right | 4.7 km || 
|-id=158 bgcolor=#E9E9E9
| 417158 ||  || — || September 30, 2005 || Mount Lemmon || Mount Lemmon Survey || — || align=right | 2.2 km || 
|-id=159 bgcolor=#E9E9E9
| 417159 ||  || — || November 21, 2005 || Kitt Peak || Spacewatch || — || align=right | 2.4 km || 
|-id=160 bgcolor=#E9E9E9
| 417160 ||  || — || November 21, 2005 || Kitt Peak || Spacewatch || — || align=right | 2.5 km || 
|-id=161 bgcolor=#E9E9E9
| 417161 ||  || — || November 22, 2005 || Kitt Peak || Spacewatch || AST || align=right | 1.6 km || 
|-id=162 bgcolor=#E9E9E9
| 417162 ||  || — || November 21, 2005 || Anderson Mesa || LONEOS || — || align=right | 2.1 km || 
|-id=163 bgcolor=#E9E9E9
| 417163 ||  || — || November 22, 2005 || Kitt Peak || Spacewatch || — || align=right | 2.0 km || 
|-id=164 bgcolor=#E9E9E9
| 417164 ||  || — || November 12, 2005 || Kitt Peak || Spacewatch || — || align=right | 1.7 km || 
|-id=165 bgcolor=#E9E9E9
| 417165 ||  || — || November 25, 2005 || Kitt Peak || Spacewatch || AGN || align=right | 1.0 km || 
|-id=166 bgcolor=#E9E9E9
| 417166 ||  || — || November 25, 2005 || Kitt Peak || Spacewatch || — || align=right | 2.1 km || 
|-id=167 bgcolor=#FFC2E0
| 417167 ||  || — || November 30, 2005 || Socorro || LINEAR || AMO || align=right data-sort-value="0.56" | 560 m || 
|-id=168 bgcolor=#E9E9E9
| 417168 ||  || — || November 21, 2005 || Catalina || CSS || — || align=right | 2.5 km || 
|-id=169 bgcolor=#E9E9E9
| 417169 ||  || — || November 21, 2005 || Kitt Peak || Spacewatch || ADE || align=right | 2.9 km || 
|-id=170 bgcolor=#E9E9E9
| 417170 ||  || — || November 21, 2005 || Catalina || CSS || — || align=right | 2.5 km || 
|-id=171 bgcolor=#E9E9E9
| 417171 ||  || — || November 5, 2005 || Kitt Peak || Spacewatch || AEO || align=right data-sort-value="0.89" | 890 m || 
|-id=172 bgcolor=#E9E9E9
| 417172 ||  || — || November 25, 2005 || Kitt Peak || Spacewatch || — || align=right | 2.4 km || 
|-id=173 bgcolor=#E9E9E9
| 417173 ||  || — || November 26, 2005 || Mount Lemmon || Mount Lemmon Survey || AGN || align=right | 1.1 km || 
|-id=174 bgcolor=#E9E9E9
| 417174 ||  || — || November 26, 2005 || Mount Lemmon || Mount Lemmon Survey || — || align=right | 1.2 km || 
|-id=175 bgcolor=#E9E9E9
| 417175 ||  || — || November 25, 2005 || Mount Lemmon || Mount Lemmon Survey || — || align=right | 2.0 km || 
|-id=176 bgcolor=#E9E9E9
| 417176 ||  || — || April 29, 2003 || Kitt Peak || Spacewatch || PAD || align=right | 2.0 km || 
|-id=177 bgcolor=#E9E9E9
| 417177 ||  || — || November 28, 2005 || Catalina || CSS || — || align=right | 3.4 km || 
|-id=178 bgcolor=#E9E9E9
| 417178 ||  || — || November 30, 2005 || Socorro || LINEAR || — || align=right | 1.7 km || 
|-id=179 bgcolor=#E9E9E9
| 417179 ||  || — || November 28, 2005 || Mount Lemmon || Mount Lemmon Survey || — || align=right | 1.5 km || 
|-id=180 bgcolor=#E9E9E9
| 417180 ||  || — || November 25, 2005 || Kitt Peak || Spacewatch || AGNcritical || align=right data-sort-value="0.82" | 820 m || 
|-id=181 bgcolor=#E9E9E9
| 417181 ||  || — || November 26, 2005 || Mount Lemmon || Mount Lemmon Survey || — || align=right | 2.0 km || 
|-id=182 bgcolor=#E9E9E9
| 417182 ||  || — || November 26, 2005 || Mount Lemmon || Mount Lemmon Survey || — || align=right | 1.7 km || 
|-id=183 bgcolor=#E9E9E9
| 417183 ||  || — || November 26, 2005 || Mount Lemmon || Mount Lemmon Survey || critical || align=right | 1.9 km || 
|-id=184 bgcolor=#d6d6d6
| 417184 ||  || — || November 28, 2005 || Mount Lemmon || Mount Lemmon Survey || BRA || align=right | 1.5 km || 
|-id=185 bgcolor=#E9E9E9
| 417185 ||  || — || November 28, 2005 || Socorro || LINEAR || — || align=right | 2.4 km || 
|-id=186 bgcolor=#E9E9E9
| 417186 ||  || — || November 29, 2005 || Socorro || LINEAR || — || align=right | 1.5 km || 
|-id=187 bgcolor=#E9E9E9
| 417187 ||  || — || November 29, 2005 || Kitt Peak || Spacewatch || — || align=right | 2.3 km || 
|-id=188 bgcolor=#E9E9E9
| 417188 ||  || — || November 29, 2005 || Kitt Peak || Spacewatch || MAR || align=right | 1.1 km || 
|-id=189 bgcolor=#E9E9E9
| 417189 ||  || — || November 22, 2005 || Kitt Peak || Spacewatch || AGN || align=right | 1.2 km || 
|-id=190 bgcolor=#E9E9E9
| 417190 ||  || — || November 30, 2005 || Mount Lemmon || Mount Lemmon Survey || — || align=right | 1.6 km || 
|-id=191 bgcolor=#E9E9E9
| 417191 ||  || — || November 30, 2005 || Kitt Peak || Spacewatch || — || align=right | 1.9 km || 
|-id=192 bgcolor=#E9E9E9
| 417192 ||  || — || November 26, 2005 || Socorro || LINEAR || — || align=right | 5.0 km || 
|-id=193 bgcolor=#E9E9E9
| 417193 ||  || — || November 29, 2005 || Kitt Peak || Spacewatch || NEM || align=right | 2.1 km || 
|-id=194 bgcolor=#E9E9E9
| 417194 ||  || — || November 28, 2005 || Catalina || CSS || — || align=right | 2.7 km || 
|-id=195 bgcolor=#E9E9E9
| 417195 ||  || — || November 26, 2005 || Mount Lemmon || Mount Lemmon Survey || EUN || align=right | 2.0 km || 
|-id=196 bgcolor=#E9E9E9
| 417196 ||  || — || November 25, 2005 || Kitt Peak || Spacewatch || — || align=right | 2.0 km || 
|-id=197 bgcolor=#E9E9E9
| 417197 ||  || — || November 25, 2005 || Kitt Peak || Spacewatch || — || align=right | 2.1 km || 
|-id=198 bgcolor=#E9E9E9
| 417198 ||  || — || November 29, 2005 || Kitt Peak || Spacewatch || — || align=right | 2.6 km || 
|-id=199 bgcolor=#E9E9E9
| 417199 ||  || — || November 25, 2005 || Mount Lemmon || Mount Lemmon Survey || AGN || align=right | 1.2 km || 
|-id=200 bgcolor=#E9E9E9
| 417200 ||  || — || December 1, 2005 || Palomar || NEAT || — || align=right | 2.3 km || 
|}

417201–417300 

|-bgcolor=#FFC2E0
| 417201 ||  || — || December 4, 2005 || Siding Spring || SSS || AMO || align=right data-sort-value="0.40" | 400 m || 
|-id=202 bgcolor=#E9E9E9
| 417202 ||  || — || November 6, 2005 || Mount Lemmon || Mount Lemmon Survey || — || align=right | 1.5 km || 
|-id=203 bgcolor=#d6d6d6
| 417203 ||  || — || December 1, 2005 || Kitt Peak || Spacewatch || — || align=right | 3.2 km || 
|-id=204 bgcolor=#FA8072
| 417204 ||  || — || December 5, 2005 || Socorro || LINEAR || — || align=right | 3.6 km || 
|-id=205 bgcolor=#E9E9E9
| 417205 ||  || — || December 2, 2005 || Mount Lemmon || Mount Lemmon Survey || — || align=right | 1.4 km || 
|-id=206 bgcolor=#E9E9E9
| 417206 ||  || — || December 2, 2005 || Kitt Peak || Spacewatch || DOR || align=right | 2.8 km || 
|-id=207 bgcolor=#E9E9E9
| 417207 ||  || — || December 2, 2005 || Mount Lemmon || Mount Lemmon Survey || NEM || align=right | 1.7 km || 
|-id=208 bgcolor=#E9E9E9
| 417208 ||  || — || December 2, 2005 || Mount Lemmon || Mount Lemmon Survey || — || align=right | 2.2 km || 
|-id=209 bgcolor=#E9E9E9
| 417209 ||  || — || December 5, 2005 || Socorro || LINEAR || — || align=right | 1.8 km || 
|-id=210 bgcolor=#FFC2E0
| 417210 ||  || — || December 10, 2005 || Catalina || CSS || ATE || align=right data-sort-value="0.27" | 270 m || 
|-id=211 bgcolor=#FFC2E0
| 417211 ||  || — || December 14, 2005 || Anderson Mesa || LONEOS || APO +1kmPHA || align=right data-sort-value="0.81" | 810 m || 
|-id=212 bgcolor=#E9E9E9
| 417212 ||  || — || December 8, 2005 || Kitt Peak || Spacewatch || AGN || align=right | 1.2 km || 
|-id=213 bgcolor=#E9E9E9
| 417213 ||  || — || December 10, 2005 || Kitt Peak || Spacewatch || AGN || align=right data-sort-value="0.99" | 990 m || 
|-id=214 bgcolor=#E9E9E9
| 417214 ||  || — || December 1, 2005 || Kitt Peak || M. W. Buie || — || align=right | 2.6 km || 
|-id=215 bgcolor=#E9E9E9
| 417215 ||  || — || December 1, 2005 || Kitt Peak || M. W. Buie || — || align=right | 3.5 km || 
|-id=216 bgcolor=#E9E9E9
| 417216 ||  || — || December 1, 2005 || Kitt Peak || M. W. Buie || — || align=right data-sort-value="0.94" | 940 m || 
|-id=217 bgcolor=#FFC2E0
| 417217 ||  || — || December 21, 2005 || Socorro || LINEAR || ATEPHA || align=right data-sort-value="0.43" | 430 m || 
|-id=218 bgcolor=#E9E9E9
| 417218 ||  || — || November 30, 2005 || Kitt Peak || Spacewatch || — || align=right | 2.2 km || 
|-id=219 bgcolor=#E9E9E9
| 417219 ||  || — || December 22, 2005 || Kitt Peak || Spacewatch || — || align=right | 2.0 km || 
|-id=220 bgcolor=#d6d6d6
| 417220 ||  || — || December 24, 2005 || Kitt Peak || Spacewatch || — || align=right | 2.5 km || 
|-id=221 bgcolor=#E9E9E9
| 417221 ||  || — || December 22, 2005 || Kitt Peak || Spacewatch || — || align=right | 2.2 km || 
|-id=222 bgcolor=#E9E9E9
| 417222 ||  || — || December 22, 2005 || Kitt Peak || Spacewatch || — || align=right | 2.7 km || 
|-id=223 bgcolor=#E9E9E9
| 417223 ||  || — || December 24, 2005 || Kitt Peak || Spacewatch || — || align=right | 2.0 km || 
|-id=224 bgcolor=#E9E9E9
| 417224 ||  || — || December 21, 2005 || Catalina || CSS || 526 || align=right | 2.9 km || 
|-id=225 bgcolor=#E9E9E9
| 417225 ||  || — || December 22, 2005 || Catalina || CSS || — || align=right | 1.8 km || 
|-id=226 bgcolor=#E9E9E9
| 417226 ||  || — || December 25, 2005 || Kitt Peak || Spacewatch || — || align=right | 2.2 km || 
|-id=227 bgcolor=#E9E9E9
| 417227 ||  || — || December 22, 2005 || Kitt Peak || Spacewatch || — || align=right | 2.0 km || 
|-id=228 bgcolor=#E9E9E9
| 417228 ||  || — || December 25, 2005 || Kitt Peak || Spacewatch || AGN || align=right | 1.0 km || 
|-id=229 bgcolor=#fefefe
| 417229 ||  || — || November 30, 2005 || Mount Lemmon || Mount Lemmon Survey || — || align=right data-sort-value="0.76" | 760 m || 
|-id=230 bgcolor=#d6d6d6
| 417230 ||  || — || November 30, 2005 || Kitt Peak || Spacewatch || KOR || align=right | 1.4 km || 
|-id=231 bgcolor=#E9E9E9
| 417231 ||  || — || December 24, 2005 || Kitt Peak || Spacewatch || — || align=right | 1.8 km || 
|-id=232 bgcolor=#E9E9E9
| 417232 ||  || — || December 27, 2005 || Mount Lemmon || Mount Lemmon Survey || — || align=right | 1.7 km || 
|-id=233 bgcolor=#E9E9E9
| 417233 ||  || — || December 5, 2005 || Socorro || LINEAR || — || align=right | 2.6 km || 
|-id=234 bgcolor=#E9E9E9
| 417234 ||  || — || December 24, 2005 || Kitt Peak || Spacewatch || — || align=right | 1.7 km || 
|-id=235 bgcolor=#E9E9E9
| 417235 ||  || — || December 24, 2005 || Kitt Peak || Spacewatch || — || align=right | 2.4 km || 
|-id=236 bgcolor=#E9E9E9
| 417236 ||  || — || December 25, 2005 || Mount Lemmon || Mount Lemmon Survey || — || align=right | 2.2 km || 
|-id=237 bgcolor=#E9E9E9
| 417237 ||  || — || December 27, 2005 || Socorro || LINEAR || — || align=right | 2.6 km || 
|-id=238 bgcolor=#E9E9E9
| 417238 ||  || — || December 27, 2005 || Mount Lemmon || Mount Lemmon Survey || — || align=right | 2.1 km || 
|-id=239 bgcolor=#E9E9E9
| 417239 ||  || — || December 25, 2005 || Kitt Peak || Spacewatch || — || align=right | 2.0 km || 
|-id=240 bgcolor=#d6d6d6
| 417240 ||  || — || December 25, 2005 || Kitt Peak || Spacewatch || — || align=right | 2.0 km || 
|-id=241 bgcolor=#E9E9E9
| 417241 ||  || — || December 22, 2005 || Catalina || CSS || — || align=right | 2.4 km || 
|-id=242 bgcolor=#d6d6d6
| 417242 ||  || — || December 10, 2005 || Kitt Peak || Spacewatch || — || align=right | 2.9 km || 
|-id=243 bgcolor=#E9E9E9
| 417243 ||  || — || December 27, 2005 || Kitt Peak || Spacewatch || — || align=right | 2.2 km || 
|-id=244 bgcolor=#E9E9E9
| 417244 ||  || — || December 27, 2005 || Kitt Peak || Spacewatch || — || align=right | 2.3 km || 
|-id=245 bgcolor=#E9E9E9
| 417245 ||  || — || December 27, 2005 || Socorro || LINEAR || — || align=right | 1.9 km || 
|-id=246 bgcolor=#E9E9E9
| 417246 ||  || — || December 27, 2005 || Mount Lemmon || Mount Lemmon Survey || — || align=right | 2.6 km || 
|-id=247 bgcolor=#d6d6d6
| 417247 ||  || — || December 28, 2005 || Kitt Peak || Spacewatch || — || align=right | 2.9 km || 
|-id=248 bgcolor=#fefefe
| 417248 ||  || — || December 30, 2005 || Kitt Peak || Spacewatch || — || align=right data-sort-value="0.73" | 730 m || 
|-id=249 bgcolor=#E9E9E9
| 417249 ||  || — || December 25, 2005 || Mount Lemmon || Mount Lemmon Survey || AEO || align=right | 1.1 km || 
|-id=250 bgcolor=#E9E9E9
| 417250 ||  || — || December 27, 2005 || Kitt Peak || Spacewatch || MRX || align=right | 1.0 km || 
|-id=251 bgcolor=#E9E9E9
| 417251 ||  || — || December 29, 2005 || Kitt Peak || Spacewatch || — || align=right | 1.7 km || 
|-id=252 bgcolor=#d6d6d6
| 417252 ||  || — || December 30, 2005 || Kitt Peak || Spacewatch || — || align=right | 2.1 km || 
|-id=253 bgcolor=#E9E9E9
| 417253 ||  || — || December 21, 2005 || Catalina || CSS || — || align=right | 3.2 km || 
|-id=254 bgcolor=#d6d6d6
| 417254 ||  || — || December 25, 2005 || Mount Lemmon || Mount Lemmon Survey || — || align=right | 2.3 km || 
|-id=255 bgcolor=#E9E9E9
| 417255 ||  || — || December 2, 2005 || Kitt Peak || Spacewatch || — || align=right | 3.0 km || 
|-id=256 bgcolor=#E9E9E9
| 417256 ||  || — || December 28, 2005 || Kitt Peak || Spacewatch || — || align=right | 2.1 km || 
|-id=257 bgcolor=#d6d6d6
| 417257 ||  || — || December 30, 2005 || Kitt Peak || Spacewatch || — || align=right | 1.8 km || 
|-id=258 bgcolor=#E9E9E9
| 417258 ||  || — || December 30, 2005 || Mount Lemmon || Mount Lemmon Survey || — || align=right | 2.3 km || 
|-id=259 bgcolor=#E9E9E9
| 417259 ||  || — || December 22, 2005 || Kitt Peak || Spacewatch || — || align=right | 1.9 km || 
|-id=260 bgcolor=#E9E9E9
| 417260 ||  || — || December 24, 2005 || Kitt Peak || Spacewatch || — || align=right | 1.8 km || 
|-id=261 bgcolor=#E9E9E9
| 417261 ||  || — || December 24, 2005 || Kitt Peak || Spacewatch || NEM || align=right | 2.1 km || 
|-id=262 bgcolor=#E9E9E9
| 417262 ||  || — || December 28, 2005 || Kitt Peak || Spacewatch || GEF || align=right | 1.2 km || 
|-id=263 bgcolor=#E9E9E9
| 417263 ||  || — || December 31, 2005 || Kitt Peak || Spacewatch || — || align=right | 3.4 km || 
|-id=264 bgcolor=#FFC2E0
| 417264 ||  || — || January 5, 2006 || Catalina || CSS || AMO +1km || align=right | 1.9 km || 
|-id=265 bgcolor=#d6d6d6
| 417265 ||  || — || December 29, 2005 || Catalina || CSS || — || align=right | 3.1 km || 
|-id=266 bgcolor=#fefefe
| 417266 ||  || — || January 5, 2006 || Mount Lemmon || Mount Lemmon Survey || — || align=right data-sort-value="0.77" | 770 m || 
|-id=267 bgcolor=#d6d6d6
| 417267 ||  || — || December 5, 2005 || Mount Lemmon || Mount Lemmon Survey || BRA || align=right | 1.4 km || 
|-id=268 bgcolor=#E9E9E9
| 417268 ||  || — || January 2, 2006 || Catalina || CSS || — || align=right | 2.4 km || 
|-id=269 bgcolor=#E9E9E9
| 417269 ||  || — || January 5, 2006 || Catalina || CSS || JUN || align=right | 1.2 km || 
|-id=270 bgcolor=#E9E9E9
| 417270 ||  || — || January 5, 2006 || Catalina || CSS || — || align=right | 4.1 km || 
|-id=271 bgcolor=#E9E9E9
| 417271 ||  || — || January 5, 2006 || Kitt Peak || Spacewatch || — || align=right | 1.8 km || 
|-id=272 bgcolor=#E9E9E9
| 417272 ||  || — || December 22, 2005 || Kitt Peak || Spacewatch || — || align=right | 2.3 km || 
|-id=273 bgcolor=#d6d6d6
| 417273 ||  || — || January 6, 2006 || Kitt Peak || Spacewatch || — || align=right | 2.7 km || 
|-id=274 bgcolor=#C2FFFF
| 417274 ||  || — || January 7, 2006 || Kitt Peak || Spacewatch || L5 || align=right | 8.7 km || 
|-id=275 bgcolor=#E9E9E9
| 417275 ||  || — || January 7, 2006 || Mount Lemmon || Mount Lemmon Survey || — || align=right | 1.8 km || 
|-id=276 bgcolor=#E9E9E9
| 417276 ||  || — || December 26, 2005 || Mount Lemmon || Mount Lemmon Survey || NEM || align=right | 2.9 km || 
|-id=277 bgcolor=#E9E9E9
| 417277 ||  || — || January 8, 2006 || Mount Lemmon || Mount Lemmon Survey || — || align=right | 1.8 km || 
|-id=278 bgcolor=#d6d6d6
| 417278 ||  || — || January 5, 2006 || Kitt Peak || Spacewatch || — || align=right | 2.3 km || 
|-id=279 bgcolor=#d6d6d6
| 417279 ||  || — || January 8, 2006 || Kitt Peak || Spacewatch || KOR || align=right | 1.2 km || 
|-id=280 bgcolor=#E9E9E9
| 417280 ||  || — || January 9, 2006 || Mount Lemmon || Mount Lemmon Survey || — || align=right | 3.1 km || 
|-id=281 bgcolor=#E9E9E9
| 417281 ||  || — || January 6, 2006 || Mount Lemmon || Mount Lemmon Survey || — || align=right | 2.0 km || 
|-id=282 bgcolor=#E9E9E9
| 417282 ||  || — || January 3, 2006 || Socorro || LINEAR || — || align=right | 3.0 km || 
|-id=283 bgcolor=#d6d6d6
| 417283 ||  || — || January 6, 2006 || Catalina || CSS || — || align=right | 4.1 km || 
|-id=284 bgcolor=#d6d6d6
| 417284 ||  || — || January 7, 2006 || Mount Lemmon || Mount Lemmon Survey || EOS || align=right | 2.0 km || 
|-id=285 bgcolor=#E9E9E9
| 417285 ||  || — || January 7, 2006 || Mount Lemmon || Mount Lemmon Survey || — || align=right | 2.8 km || 
|-id=286 bgcolor=#d6d6d6
| 417286 ||  || — || December 25, 2005 || Mount Lemmon || Mount Lemmon Survey || — || align=right | 2.2 km || 
|-id=287 bgcolor=#E9E9E9
| 417287 ||  || — || January 8, 2006 || Kitt Peak || Spacewatch || — || align=right | 2.3 km || 
|-id=288 bgcolor=#E9E9E9
| 417288 ||  || — || November 29, 2005 || Mount Lemmon || Mount Lemmon Survey || — || align=right | 3.8 km || 
|-id=289 bgcolor=#E9E9E9
| 417289 ||  || — || November 30, 2005 || Mount Lemmon || Mount Lemmon Survey || — || align=right | 2.1 km || 
|-id=290 bgcolor=#E9E9E9
| 417290 ||  || — || December 6, 2005 || Mount Lemmon || Mount Lemmon Survey || — || align=right | 2.5 km || 
|-id=291 bgcolor=#E9E9E9
| 417291 ||  || — || January 7, 2006 || Mount Lemmon || Mount Lemmon Survey || — || align=right | 2.6 km || 
|-id=292 bgcolor=#E9E9E9
| 417292 ||  || — || January 23, 2006 || Kitt Peak || Spacewatch || — || align=right | 2.1 km || 
|-id=293 bgcolor=#E9E9E9
| 417293 ||  || — || January 22, 2006 || Mount Lemmon || Mount Lemmon Survey || AGN || align=right | 1.1 km || 
|-id=294 bgcolor=#d6d6d6
| 417294 ||  || — || January 23, 2006 || Kitt Peak || Spacewatch || — || align=right | 2.4 km || 
|-id=295 bgcolor=#E9E9E9
| 417295 ||  || — || January 23, 2006 || Kitt Peak || Spacewatch || AGN || align=right | 1.4 km || 
|-id=296 bgcolor=#E9E9E9
| 417296 ||  || — || January 23, 2006 || Kitt Peak || Spacewatch || — || align=right | 2.0 km || 
|-id=297 bgcolor=#E9E9E9
| 417297 ||  || — || January 23, 2006 || Kitt Peak || Spacewatch || — || align=right | 2.8 km || 
|-id=298 bgcolor=#E9E9E9
| 417298 ||  || — || January 23, 2006 || Kitt Peak || Spacewatch || — || align=right | 2.7 km || 
|-id=299 bgcolor=#d6d6d6
| 417299 ||  || — || January 23, 2006 || Kitt Peak || Spacewatch || BRA || align=right | 2.1 km || 
|-id=300 bgcolor=#d6d6d6
| 417300 ||  || — || January 23, 2006 || Kitt Peak || Spacewatch || — || align=right | 4.2 km || 
|}

417301–417400 

|-bgcolor=#E9E9E9
| 417301 ||  || — || January 25, 2006 || Kitt Peak || Spacewatch || JUN || align=right | 1.2 km || 
|-id=302 bgcolor=#d6d6d6
| 417302 ||  || — || January 26, 2006 || Socorro || LINEAR || — || align=right | 2.7 km || 
|-id=303 bgcolor=#d6d6d6
| 417303 ||  || — || January 26, 2006 || Mount Lemmon || Mount Lemmon Survey || — || align=right | 3.6 km || 
|-id=304 bgcolor=#E9E9E9
| 417304 ||  || — || January 27, 2006 || Mount Lemmon || Mount Lemmon Survey || AGN || align=right | 1.4 km || 
|-id=305 bgcolor=#C2FFFF
| 417305 ||  || — || January 23, 2006 || Mount Lemmon || Mount Lemmon Survey || L5 || align=right | 10 km || 
|-id=306 bgcolor=#fefefe
| 417306 ||  || — || September 12, 2001 || Kitt Peak || M. W. Buie || — || align=right data-sort-value="0.60" | 600 m || 
|-id=307 bgcolor=#E9E9E9
| 417307 ||  || — || January 25, 2006 || Kitt Peak || Spacewatch || — || align=right | 2.8 km || 
|-id=308 bgcolor=#d6d6d6
| 417308 ||  || — || January 25, 2006 || Kitt Peak || Spacewatch || — || align=right | 2.0 km || 
|-id=309 bgcolor=#fefefe
| 417309 ||  || — || January 21, 2006 || Kitt Peak || Spacewatch || — || align=right data-sort-value="0.77" | 770 m || 
|-id=310 bgcolor=#d6d6d6
| 417310 ||  || — || January 26, 2006 || Kitt Peak || Spacewatch || — || align=right | 2.8 km || 
|-id=311 bgcolor=#E9E9E9
| 417311 ||  || — || January 29, 2006 || Altschwendt || Altschwendt Obs. || — || align=right | 1.9 km || 
|-id=312 bgcolor=#d6d6d6
| 417312 ||  || — || January 23, 2006 || Kitt Peak || Spacewatch || — || align=right | 2.9 km || 
|-id=313 bgcolor=#fefefe
| 417313 ||  || — || January 25, 2006 || Kitt Peak || Spacewatch || — || align=right data-sort-value="0.55" | 550 m || 
|-id=314 bgcolor=#d6d6d6
| 417314 ||  || — || January 25, 2006 || Kitt Peak || Spacewatch || — || align=right | 2.6 km || 
|-id=315 bgcolor=#d6d6d6
| 417315 ||  || — || January 26, 2006 || Mount Lemmon || Mount Lemmon Survey || — || align=right | 2.1 km || 
|-id=316 bgcolor=#E9E9E9
| 417316 ||  || — || January 26, 2006 || Mount Lemmon || Mount Lemmon Survey || — || align=right | 2.4 km || 
|-id=317 bgcolor=#fefefe
| 417317 ||  || — || January 26, 2006 || Kitt Peak || Spacewatch || — || align=right data-sort-value="0.69" | 690 m || 
|-id=318 bgcolor=#d6d6d6
| 417318 ||  || — || January 26, 2006 || Mount Lemmon || Mount Lemmon Survey || — || align=right | 3.7 km || 
|-id=319 bgcolor=#d6d6d6
| 417319 ||  || — || January 27, 2006 || Mount Lemmon || Mount Lemmon Survey || EOS || align=right | 1.7 km || 
|-id=320 bgcolor=#d6d6d6
| 417320 ||  || — || January 23, 2006 || Kitt Peak || Spacewatch || — || align=right | 2.4 km || 
|-id=321 bgcolor=#fefefe
| 417321 ||  || — || January 25, 1996 || Kitt Peak || Spacewatch || — || align=right data-sort-value="0.91" | 910 m || 
|-id=322 bgcolor=#d6d6d6
| 417322 ||  || — || August 25, 2003 || Palomar || NEAT || — || align=right | 3.1 km || 
|-id=323 bgcolor=#d6d6d6
| 417323 ||  || — || January 25, 2006 || Kitt Peak || Spacewatch || — || align=right | 2.0 km || 
|-id=324 bgcolor=#C2FFFF
| 417324 ||  || — || January 23, 2006 || Mount Lemmon || Mount Lemmon Survey || L5 || align=right | 8.9 km || 
|-id=325 bgcolor=#E9E9E9
| 417325 ||  || — || February 1, 2006 || Kitt Peak || Spacewatch || — || align=right | 1.9 km || 
|-id=326 bgcolor=#E9E9E9
| 417326 ||  || — || February 2, 2006 || Kitt Peak || Spacewatch || — || align=right | 1.9 km || 
|-id=327 bgcolor=#C2FFFF
| 417327 ||  || — || February 2, 2006 || Kitt Peak || Spacewatch || L5 || align=right | 9.7 km || 
|-id=328 bgcolor=#d6d6d6
| 417328 ||  || — || January 7, 2006 || Mount Lemmon || Mount Lemmon Survey || — || align=right | 2.6 km || 
|-id=329 bgcolor=#d6d6d6
| 417329 ||  || — || January 22, 2006 || Mount Lemmon || Mount Lemmon Survey || — || align=right | 2.4 km || 
|-id=330 bgcolor=#d6d6d6
| 417330 ||  || — || February 20, 2006 || Kitt Peak || Spacewatch || — || align=right | 2.7 km || 
|-id=331 bgcolor=#d6d6d6
| 417331 ||  || — || January 31, 2006 || Kitt Peak || Spacewatch || KOR || align=right | 1.4 km || 
|-id=332 bgcolor=#d6d6d6
| 417332 ||  || — || January 23, 2006 || Kitt Peak || Spacewatch || — || align=right | 2.7 km || 
|-id=333 bgcolor=#d6d6d6
| 417333 ||  || — || February 20, 2006 || Kitt Peak || Spacewatch || — || align=right | 2.1 km || 
|-id=334 bgcolor=#E9E9E9
| 417334 ||  || — || February 20, 2006 || Kitt Peak || Spacewatch || AGN || align=right | 1.2 km || 
|-id=335 bgcolor=#d6d6d6
| 417335 ||  || — || February 24, 2006 || Mount Lemmon || Mount Lemmon Survey || — || align=right | 3.6 km || 
|-id=336 bgcolor=#d6d6d6
| 417336 ||  || — || February 20, 2006 || Kitt Peak || Spacewatch || — || align=right | 2.5 km || 
|-id=337 bgcolor=#E9E9E9
| 417337 ||  || — || February 24, 2006 || Kitt Peak || Spacewatch || — || align=right | 1.5 km || 
|-id=338 bgcolor=#E9E9E9
| 417338 ||  || — || February 24, 2006 || Kitt Peak || Spacewatch || — || align=right | 2.4 km || 
|-id=339 bgcolor=#fefefe
| 417339 ||  || — || February 24, 2006 || Kitt Peak || Spacewatch || — || align=right data-sort-value="0.80" | 800 m || 
|-id=340 bgcolor=#d6d6d6
| 417340 ||  || — || February 25, 2006 || Kitt Peak || Spacewatch || — || align=right | 2.8 km || 
|-id=341 bgcolor=#d6d6d6
| 417341 ||  || — || February 27, 2006 || Mount Lemmon || Mount Lemmon Survey || — || align=right | 3.1 km || 
|-id=342 bgcolor=#E9E9E9
| 417342 ||  || — || February 24, 2006 || Anderson Mesa || LONEOS || — || align=right | 1.6 km || 
|-id=343 bgcolor=#E9E9E9
| 417343 ||  || — || February 25, 2006 || Kitt Peak || Spacewatch || — || align=right | 1.9 km || 
|-id=344 bgcolor=#d6d6d6
| 417344 ||  || — || February 25, 2006 || Mount Lemmon || Mount Lemmon Survey || — || align=right | 2.0 km || 
|-id=345 bgcolor=#d6d6d6
| 417345 ||  || — || February 25, 2006 || Kitt Peak || Spacewatch || — || align=right | 2.9 km || 
|-id=346 bgcolor=#fefefe
| 417346 ||  || — || February 27, 2006 || Kitt Peak || Spacewatch || — || align=right data-sort-value="0.60" | 600 m || 
|-id=347 bgcolor=#fefefe
| 417347 ||  || — || February 27, 2006 || Mount Lemmon || Mount Lemmon Survey || — || align=right data-sort-value="0.73" | 730 m || 
|-id=348 bgcolor=#d6d6d6
| 417348 ||  || — || February 27, 2006 || Catalina || CSS || — || align=right | 3.9 km || 
|-id=349 bgcolor=#d6d6d6
| 417349 ||  || — || March 2, 2006 || Kitt Peak || Spacewatch || — || align=right | 2.4 km || 
|-id=350 bgcolor=#d6d6d6
| 417350 ||  || — || February 24, 2006 || Kitt Peak || Spacewatch || — || align=right | 2.3 km || 
|-id=351 bgcolor=#d6d6d6
| 417351 ||  || — || March 3, 2006 || Kitt Peak || Spacewatch || — || align=right | 2.3 km || 
|-id=352 bgcolor=#d6d6d6
| 417352 ||  || — || March 3, 2006 || Kitt Peak || Spacewatch || — || align=right | 3.1 km || 
|-id=353 bgcolor=#d6d6d6
| 417353 ||  || — || March 4, 2006 || Kitt Peak || Spacewatch || EOS || align=right | 2.0 km || 
|-id=354 bgcolor=#C2FFFF
| 417354 ||  || — || February 2, 2006 || Kitt Peak || Spacewatch || L5 || align=right | 9.2 km || 
|-id=355 bgcolor=#d6d6d6
| 417355 ||  || — || January 25, 2006 || Kitt Peak || Spacewatch || — || align=right | 2.8 km || 
|-id=356 bgcolor=#fefefe
| 417356 ||  || — || March 23, 2006 || Kitt Peak || Spacewatch || — || align=right data-sort-value="0.75" | 750 m || 
|-id=357 bgcolor=#fefefe
| 417357 ||  || — || March 23, 2006 || Mount Lemmon || Mount Lemmon Survey || — || align=right data-sort-value="0.60" | 600 m || 
|-id=358 bgcolor=#d6d6d6
| 417358 ||  || — || March 24, 2006 || Mount Lemmon || Mount Lemmon Survey || — || align=right | 2.9 km || 
|-id=359 bgcolor=#d6d6d6
| 417359 ||  || — || March 24, 2006 || Mount Lemmon || Mount Lemmon Survey || EOS || align=right | 1.9 km || 
|-id=360 bgcolor=#d6d6d6
| 417360 ||  || — || March 24, 2006 || Mount Lemmon || Mount Lemmon Survey || — || align=right | 3.1 km || 
|-id=361 bgcolor=#d6d6d6
| 417361 ||  || — || March 25, 2006 || Kitt Peak || Spacewatch || — || align=right | 3.1 km || 
|-id=362 bgcolor=#E9E9E9
| 417362 ||  || — || March 3, 2006 || Catalina || CSS || — || align=right | 2.8 km || 
|-id=363 bgcolor=#d6d6d6
| 417363 ||  || — || March 24, 2006 || Mount Lemmon || Mount Lemmon Survey || — || align=right | 2.7 km || 
|-id=364 bgcolor=#d6d6d6
| 417364 ||  || — || March 23, 2006 || Mount Lemmon || Mount Lemmon Survey || — || align=right | 2.5 km || 
|-id=365 bgcolor=#d6d6d6
| 417365 ||  || — || April 27, 2001 || Great Shefford || Spacewatch || EOS || align=right | 2.4 km || 
|-id=366 bgcolor=#d6d6d6
| 417366 ||  || — || April 5, 2006 || Cordell-Lorenz || D. T. Durig, C. E. Plunkett || — || align=right | 3.6 km || 
|-id=367 bgcolor=#fefefe
| 417367 ||  || — || April 2, 2006 || Kitt Peak || Spacewatch || — || align=right data-sort-value="0.88" | 880 m || 
|-id=368 bgcolor=#d6d6d6
| 417368 ||  || — || April 2, 2006 || Kitt Peak || Spacewatch || HYG || align=right | 3.1 km || 
|-id=369 bgcolor=#d6d6d6
| 417369 ||  || — || April 4, 1995 || Kitt Peak || Spacewatch || — || align=right | 3.0 km || 
|-id=370 bgcolor=#d6d6d6
| 417370 ||  || — || April 7, 2006 || Catalina || CSS || — || align=right | 4.5 km || 
|-id=371 bgcolor=#fefefe
| 417371 ||  || — || April 8, 2006 || Anderson Mesa || LONEOS || — || align=right | 1.2 km || 
|-id=372 bgcolor=#d6d6d6
| 417372 ||  || — || April 9, 2006 || Kitt Peak || Spacewatch || — || align=right | 2.6 km || 
|-id=373 bgcolor=#d6d6d6
| 417373 ||  || — || April 9, 2006 || Kitt Peak || Spacewatch || — || align=right | 2.8 km || 
|-id=374 bgcolor=#d6d6d6
| 417374 ||  || — || April 20, 2006 || Kitt Peak || Spacewatch || — || align=right | 2.5 km || 
|-id=375 bgcolor=#d6d6d6
| 417375 ||  || — || April 20, 2006 || Kitt Peak || Spacewatch || EMA || align=right | 4.3 km || 
|-id=376 bgcolor=#d6d6d6
| 417376 ||  || — || April 21, 2006 || Mount Lemmon || Mount Lemmon Survey || — || align=right | 3.4 km || 
|-id=377 bgcolor=#d6d6d6
| 417377 ||  || — || April 19, 2006 || Palomar || NEAT || — || align=right | 3.8 km || 
|-id=378 bgcolor=#d6d6d6
| 417378 ||  || — || April 19, 2006 || Anderson Mesa || LONEOS || EOS || align=right | 2.6 km || 
|-id=379 bgcolor=#d6d6d6
| 417379 ||  || — || April 24, 2006 || Anderson Mesa || LONEOS || — || align=right | 3.4 km || 
|-id=380 bgcolor=#d6d6d6
| 417380 ||  || — || April 29, 2006 || Wrightwood || J. W. Young || — || align=right | 3.4 km || 
|-id=381 bgcolor=#fefefe
| 417381 ||  || — || April 28, 2006 || Socorro || LINEAR || (2076) || align=right data-sort-value="0.99" | 990 m || 
|-id=382 bgcolor=#fefefe
| 417382 ||  || — || April 24, 2006 || Anderson Mesa || LONEOS || — || align=right | 1.0 km || 
|-id=383 bgcolor=#d6d6d6
| 417383 ||  || — || April 24, 2006 || Mount Lemmon || Mount Lemmon Survey || — || align=right | 3.6 km || 
|-id=384 bgcolor=#d6d6d6
| 417384 ||  || — || April 24, 2006 || Kitt Peak || Spacewatch || — || align=right | 3.2 km || 
|-id=385 bgcolor=#d6d6d6
| 417385 ||  || — || April 25, 2006 || Kitt Peak || Spacewatch || — || align=right | 3.4 km || 
|-id=386 bgcolor=#d6d6d6
| 417386 ||  || — || April 25, 2006 || Kitt Peak || Spacewatch || — || align=right | 3.1 km || 
|-id=387 bgcolor=#d6d6d6
| 417387 ||  || — || April 29, 2006 || Kitt Peak || Spacewatch || — || align=right | 3.6 km || 
|-id=388 bgcolor=#d6d6d6
| 417388 ||  || — || April 29, 2006 || Kitt Peak || Spacewatch || — || align=right | 3.1 km || 
|-id=389 bgcolor=#fefefe
| 417389 ||  || — || April 30, 2006 || Kitt Peak || Spacewatch || — || align=right data-sort-value="0.87" | 870 m || 
|-id=390 bgcolor=#d6d6d6
| 417390 ||  || — || April 30, 2006 || Kitt Peak || Spacewatch || — || align=right | 2.7 km || 
|-id=391 bgcolor=#d6d6d6
| 417391 ||  || — || April 26, 2006 || Kitt Peak || Spacewatch || EOS || align=right | 2.1 km || 
|-id=392 bgcolor=#d6d6d6
| 417392 ||  || — || April 26, 2006 || Kitt Peak || Spacewatch || VER || align=right | 2.8 km || 
|-id=393 bgcolor=#fefefe
| 417393 ||  || — || April 26, 2006 || Kitt Peak || Spacewatch || — || align=right data-sort-value="0.77" | 770 m || 
|-id=394 bgcolor=#fefefe
| 417394 ||  || — || April 30, 2006 || Kitt Peak || Spacewatch || — || align=right data-sort-value="0.69" | 690 m || 
|-id=395 bgcolor=#d6d6d6
| 417395 ||  || — || April 26, 2006 || Catalina || CSS || Tj (2.99) || align=right | 4.6 km || 
|-id=396 bgcolor=#d6d6d6
| 417396 ||  || — || April 26, 2006 || Cerro Tololo || M. W. Buie || — || align=right | 2.4 km || 
|-id=397 bgcolor=#d6d6d6
| 417397 ||  || — || April 27, 2006 || Cerro Tololo || M. W. Buie || — || align=right | 3.7 km || 
|-id=398 bgcolor=#d6d6d6
| 417398 ||  || — || April 24, 2006 || Kitt Peak || Spacewatch || — || align=right | 3.5 km || 
|-id=399 bgcolor=#d6d6d6
| 417399 ||  || — || April 26, 2006 || Kitt Peak || Spacewatch || — || align=right | 2.9 km || 
|-id=400 bgcolor=#d6d6d6
| 417400 ||  || — || April 29, 2006 || Kitt Peak || Spacewatch || — || align=right | 4.1 km || 
|}

417401–417500 

|-bgcolor=#d6d6d6
| 417401 ||  || — || April 19, 2006 || Mount Lemmon || Mount Lemmon Survey || — || align=right | 3.4 km || 
|-id=402 bgcolor=#d6d6d6
| 417402 ||  || — || April 24, 2006 || Mount Lemmon || Mount Lemmon Survey || — || align=right | 2.1 km || 
|-id=403 bgcolor=#d6d6d6
| 417403 ||  || — || May 1, 2006 || Kitt Peak || Spacewatch || — || align=right | 2.7 km || 
|-id=404 bgcolor=#fefefe
| 417404 ||  || — || May 1, 2006 || Kitt Peak || Spacewatch || — || align=right data-sort-value="0.79" | 790 m || 
|-id=405 bgcolor=#fefefe
| 417405 ||  || — || May 1, 2006 || Kitt Peak || Spacewatch || NYS || align=right data-sort-value="0.57" | 570 m || 
|-id=406 bgcolor=#d6d6d6
| 417406 ||  || — || November 24, 2003 || Kitt Peak || Spacewatch || EOS || align=right | 2.0 km || 
|-id=407 bgcolor=#d6d6d6
| 417407 ||  || — || May 3, 2006 || Kitt Peak || Spacewatch || — || align=right | 3.7 km || 
|-id=408 bgcolor=#d6d6d6
| 417408 ||  || — || April 21, 2006 || Kitt Peak || Spacewatch || — || align=right | 2.9 km || 
|-id=409 bgcolor=#d6d6d6
| 417409 ||  || — || May 4, 2006 || Kitt Peak || Spacewatch || — || align=right | 2.3 km || 
|-id=410 bgcolor=#d6d6d6
| 417410 ||  || — || May 4, 2006 || Kitt Peak || Spacewatch || — || align=right | 2.8 km || 
|-id=411 bgcolor=#d6d6d6
| 417411 ||  || — || May 6, 2006 || Mount Lemmon || Mount Lemmon Survey || — || align=right | 4.0 km || 
|-id=412 bgcolor=#d6d6d6
| 417412 ||  || — || May 7, 2006 || Kitt Peak || Spacewatch || — || align=right | 5.0 km || 
|-id=413 bgcolor=#d6d6d6
| 417413 ||  || — || April 30, 2006 || Kitt Peak || Spacewatch || — || align=right | 3.1 km || 
|-id=414 bgcolor=#d6d6d6
| 417414 ||  || — || May 6, 2006 || Mount Lemmon || Mount Lemmon Survey || — || align=right | 2.9 km || 
|-id=415 bgcolor=#fefefe
| 417415 ||  || — || May 7, 2006 || Mount Lemmon || Mount Lemmon Survey || — || align=right | 1.0 km || 
|-id=416 bgcolor=#fefefe
| 417416 ||  || — || May 19, 2006 || Mount Lemmon || Mount Lemmon Survey || V || align=right data-sort-value="0.66" | 660 m || 
|-id=417 bgcolor=#fefefe
| 417417 ||  || — || May 19, 2006 || Palomar || NEAT || — || align=right data-sort-value="0.73" | 730 m || 
|-id=418 bgcolor=#fefefe
| 417418 ||  || — || May 21, 2006 || Kitt Peak || Spacewatch || — || align=right data-sort-value="0.86" | 860 m || 
|-id=419 bgcolor=#FFC2E0
| 417419 ||  || — || May 23, 2006 || Catalina || CSS || AMOPHA || align=right data-sort-value="0.24" | 240 m || 
|-id=420 bgcolor=#d6d6d6
| 417420 ||  || — || May 21, 2006 || Kitt Peak || Spacewatch || — || align=right | 3.9 km || 
|-id=421 bgcolor=#d6d6d6
| 417421 ||  || — || May 22, 2006 || Kitt Peak || Spacewatch || — || align=right | 4.5 km || 
|-id=422 bgcolor=#FA8072
| 417422 ||  || — || May 20, 2006 || Mount Lemmon || Mount Lemmon Survey || — || align=right data-sort-value="0.88" | 880 m || 
|-id=423 bgcolor=#d6d6d6
| 417423 ||  || — || April 12, 2000 || Kitt Peak || Spacewatch || THM || align=right | 2.3 km || 
|-id=424 bgcolor=#fefefe
| 417424 ||  || — || May 21, 2006 || Mount Lemmon || Mount Lemmon Survey || NYS || align=right data-sort-value="0.61" | 610 m || 
|-id=425 bgcolor=#d6d6d6
| 417425 ||  || — || May 21, 2006 || Kitt Peak || Spacewatch || HYG || align=right | 2.7 km || 
|-id=426 bgcolor=#fefefe
| 417426 ||  || — || May 21, 2006 || Kitt Peak || Spacewatch || — || align=right data-sort-value="0.59" | 590 m || 
|-id=427 bgcolor=#d6d6d6
| 417427 ||  || — || May 21, 2006 || Kitt Peak || Spacewatch || — || align=right | 4.0 km || 
|-id=428 bgcolor=#d6d6d6
| 417428 ||  || — || May 22, 2006 || Kitt Peak || Spacewatch || EOS || align=right | 2.0 km || 
|-id=429 bgcolor=#d6d6d6
| 417429 ||  || — || May 22, 2006 || Kitt Peak || Spacewatch || — || align=right | 3.5 km || 
|-id=430 bgcolor=#fefefe
| 417430 ||  || — || May 20, 2006 || Mount Lemmon || Mount Lemmon Survey || — || align=right data-sort-value="0.89" | 890 m || 
|-id=431 bgcolor=#d6d6d6
| 417431 ||  || — || May 22, 2006 || Kitt Peak || Spacewatch || — || align=right | 3.9 km || 
|-id=432 bgcolor=#fefefe
| 417432 ||  || — || May 22, 2006 || Kitt Peak || Spacewatch || — || align=right data-sort-value="0.74" | 740 m || 
|-id=433 bgcolor=#fefefe
| 417433 ||  || — || May 23, 2006 || Kitt Peak || Spacewatch || — || align=right data-sort-value="0.80" | 800 m || 
|-id=434 bgcolor=#d6d6d6
| 417434 ||  || — || May 23, 2006 || Kitt Peak || Spacewatch || — || align=right | 4.1 km || 
|-id=435 bgcolor=#d6d6d6
| 417435 ||  || — || May 24, 2006 || Kitt Peak || Spacewatch || — || align=right | 3.7 km || 
|-id=436 bgcolor=#d6d6d6
| 417436 ||  || — || May 25, 2006 || Mount Lemmon || Mount Lemmon Survey || — || align=right | 3.0 km || 
|-id=437 bgcolor=#fefefe
| 417437 ||  || — || May 25, 2006 || Mount Lemmon || Mount Lemmon Survey || (2076) || align=right data-sort-value="0.73" | 730 m || 
|-id=438 bgcolor=#d6d6d6
| 417438 ||  || — || May 18, 2006 || Palomar || NEAT || — || align=right | 4.0 km || 
|-id=439 bgcolor=#d6d6d6
| 417439 ||  || — || May 25, 2006 || Kitt Peak || Spacewatch || — || align=right | 4.1 km || 
|-id=440 bgcolor=#d6d6d6
| 417440 ||  || — || May 25, 2006 || Mount Lemmon || Mount Lemmon Survey || — || align=right | 4.4 km || 
|-id=441 bgcolor=#fefefe
| 417441 ||  || — || May 24, 2006 || Reedy Creek || J. Broughton || — || align=right data-sort-value="0.82" | 820 m || 
|-id=442 bgcolor=#fefefe
| 417442 ||  || — || May 27, 2006 || Kitt Peak || Spacewatch || — || align=right data-sort-value="0.77" | 770 m || 
|-id=443 bgcolor=#d6d6d6
| 417443 ||  || — || May 31, 2006 || Kitt Peak || Spacewatch || — || align=right | 3.3 km || 
|-id=444 bgcolor=#FA8072
| 417444 ||  || — || July 20, 2006 || Siding Spring || SSS || — || align=right data-sort-value="0.57" | 570 m || 
|-id=445 bgcolor=#fefefe
| 417445 ||  || — || July 20, 2006 || Palomar || NEAT || — || align=right | 1.3 km || 
|-id=446 bgcolor=#fefefe
| 417446 ||  || — || July 21, 2006 || Catalina || CSS || — || align=right | 1.7 km || 
|-id=447 bgcolor=#fefefe
| 417447 ||  || — || August 12, 2006 || Palomar || NEAT || — || align=right data-sort-value="0.98" | 980 m || 
|-id=448 bgcolor=#fefefe
| 417448 ||  || — || August 12, 2006 || Palomar || NEAT || — || align=right | 1.1 km || 
|-id=449 bgcolor=#fefefe
| 417449 ||  || — || August 13, 2006 || Palomar || NEAT || — || align=right data-sort-value="0.70" | 700 m || 
|-id=450 bgcolor=#d6d6d6
| 417450 ||  || — || February 2, 2005 || Kitt Peak || Spacewatch || — || align=right | 3.1 km || 
|-id=451 bgcolor=#fefefe
| 417451 ||  || — || August 7, 2006 || Siding Spring || SSS || — || align=right | 1.7 km || 
|-id=452 bgcolor=#fefefe
| 417452 ||  || — || August 16, 2006 || Siding Spring || SSS || V || align=right data-sort-value="0.79" | 790 m || 
|-id=453 bgcolor=#fefefe
| 417453 ||  || — || August 17, 2006 || Palomar || NEAT || NYS || align=right data-sort-value="0.63" | 630 m || 
|-id=454 bgcolor=#fefefe
| 417454 ||  || — || August 17, 2006 || Palomar || NEAT || — || align=right | 1.1 km || 
|-id=455 bgcolor=#fefefe
| 417455 ||  || — || August 17, 2006 || Palomar || NEAT || MAS || align=right data-sort-value="0.77" | 770 m || 
|-id=456 bgcolor=#fefefe
| 417456 ||  || — || August 22, 2006 || Palomar || NEAT || — || align=right data-sort-value="0.90" | 900 m || 
|-id=457 bgcolor=#fefefe
| 417457 ||  || — || August 17, 2006 || Palomar || NEAT || — || align=right data-sort-value="0.72" | 720 m || 
|-id=458 bgcolor=#fefefe
| 417458 ||  || — || August 17, 2006 || Palomar || NEAT || NYS || align=right data-sort-value="0.78" | 780 m || 
|-id=459 bgcolor=#fefefe
| 417459 ||  || — || August 22, 2006 || Palomar || NEAT || — || align=right | 1.2 km || 
|-id=460 bgcolor=#fefefe
| 417460 ||  || — || August 23, 2006 || Socorro || LINEAR || — || align=right data-sort-value="0.86" | 860 m || 
|-id=461 bgcolor=#fefefe
| 417461 ||  || — || August 19, 2006 || Palomar || NEAT || NYS || align=right data-sort-value="0.68" | 680 m || 
|-id=462 bgcolor=#FA8072
| 417462 ||  || — || August 20, 2006 || Palomar || NEAT || — || align=right | 1.0 km || 
|-id=463 bgcolor=#fefefe
| 417463 ||  || — || August 19, 2006 || Anderson Mesa || LONEOS || — || align=right | 2.0 km || 
|-id=464 bgcolor=#fefefe
| 417464 ||  || — || August 27, 2006 || Kitt Peak || Spacewatch || — || align=right | 1.3 km || 
|-id=465 bgcolor=#fefefe
| 417465 ||  || — || August 21, 2006 || Kitt Peak || Spacewatch || NYS || align=right data-sort-value="0.68" | 680 m || 
|-id=466 bgcolor=#fefefe
| 417466 ||  || — || August 16, 2006 || Palomar || NEAT || — || align=right data-sort-value="0.81" | 810 m || 
|-id=467 bgcolor=#fefefe
| 417467 ||  || — || August 23, 2006 || Palomar || NEAT || — || align=right data-sort-value="0.98" | 980 m || 
|-id=468 bgcolor=#fefefe
| 417468 ||  || — || August 28, 2006 || Catalina || CSS || — || align=right | 2.1 km || 
|-id=469 bgcolor=#fefefe
| 417469 ||  || — || August 17, 2006 || Palomar || NEAT || — || align=right | 1.0 km || 
|-id=470 bgcolor=#fefefe
| 417470 ||  || — || August 18, 2006 || Kitt Peak || Spacewatch || — || align=right | 1.6 km || 
|-id=471 bgcolor=#fefefe
| 417471 ||  || — || August 28, 2006 || Kitt Peak || Spacewatch || — || align=right data-sort-value="0.76" | 760 m || 
|-id=472 bgcolor=#fefefe
| 417472 ||  || — || September 12, 2006 || Catalina || CSS || MAS || align=right data-sort-value="0.82" | 820 m || 
|-id=473 bgcolor=#fefefe
| 417473 ||  || — || September 15, 2006 || Kitt Peak || Spacewatch || MAS || align=right data-sort-value="0.65" | 650 m || 
|-id=474 bgcolor=#fefefe
| 417474 ||  || — || September 15, 2006 || Eskridge || Farpoint Obs. || NYS || align=right data-sort-value="0.57" | 570 m || 
|-id=475 bgcolor=#d6d6d6
| 417475 ||  || — || September 15, 2006 || Kitt Peak || Spacewatch || — || align=right | 3.4 km || 
|-id=476 bgcolor=#fefefe
| 417476 ||  || — || August 27, 2006 || Kitt Peak || Spacewatch || NYS || align=right data-sort-value="0.69" | 690 m || 
|-id=477 bgcolor=#fefefe
| 417477 ||  || — || September 13, 2006 || Palomar || NEAT || — || align=right data-sort-value="0.89" | 890 m || 
|-id=478 bgcolor=#fefefe
| 417478 ||  || — || September 14, 2006 || Catalina || CSS || — || align=right | 1.2 km || 
|-id=479 bgcolor=#fefefe
| 417479 ||  || — || September 12, 2006 || Catalina || CSS || — || align=right | 2.5 km || 
|-id=480 bgcolor=#fefefe
| 417480 ||  || — || September 14, 2006 || Palomar || NEAT || MAS || align=right data-sort-value="0.69" | 690 m || 
|-id=481 bgcolor=#fefefe
| 417481 ||  || — || September 14, 2006 || Kitt Peak || Spacewatch || — || align=right data-sort-value="0.53" | 530 m || 
|-id=482 bgcolor=#fefefe
| 417482 ||  || — || September 14, 2006 || Kitt Peak || Spacewatch || MAS || align=right data-sort-value="0.62" | 620 m || 
|-id=483 bgcolor=#fefefe
| 417483 ||  || — || September 15, 2006 || Kitt Peak || Spacewatch || critical || align=right data-sort-value="0.75" | 750 m || 
|-id=484 bgcolor=#d6d6d6
| 417484 ||  || — || September 14, 2006 || Kitt Peak || Spacewatch || — || align=right | 3.7 km || 
|-id=485 bgcolor=#fefefe
| 417485 ||  || — || September 15, 2006 || Kitt Peak || Spacewatch || — || align=right data-sort-value="0.89" | 890 m || 
|-id=486 bgcolor=#fefefe
| 417486 ||  || — || September 15, 2006 || Kitt Peak || Spacewatch || — || align=right data-sort-value="0.62" | 620 m || 
|-id=487 bgcolor=#fefefe
| 417487 ||  || — || September 15, 2006 || Kitt Peak || Spacewatch || — || align=right | 2.0 km || 
|-id=488 bgcolor=#fefefe
| 417488 ||  || — || September 15, 2006 || Kitt Peak || Spacewatch || — || align=right data-sort-value="0.78" | 780 m || 
|-id=489 bgcolor=#fefefe
| 417489 ||  || — || September 15, 2006 || Kitt Peak || Spacewatch || NYS || align=right data-sort-value="0.76" | 760 m || 
|-id=490 bgcolor=#fefefe
| 417490 ||  || — || September 15, 2006 || Kitt Peak || Spacewatch || NYS || align=right data-sort-value="0.64" | 640 m || 
|-id=491 bgcolor=#fefefe
| 417491 ||  || — || August 21, 2006 || Kitt Peak || Spacewatch || — || align=right data-sort-value="0.77" | 770 m || 
|-id=492 bgcolor=#fefefe
| 417492 ||  || — || March 7, 2005 || Socorro || LINEAR || — || align=right | 1.5 km || 
|-id=493 bgcolor=#fefefe
| 417493 ||  || — || September 16, 2006 || Palomar || NEAT || — || align=right data-sort-value="0.96" | 960 m || 
|-id=494 bgcolor=#fefefe
| 417494 ||  || — || September 17, 2006 || Catalina || CSS || — || align=right data-sort-value="0.79" | 790 m || 
|-id=495 bgcolor=#FA8072
| 417495 ||  || — || September 17, 2006 || Anderson Mesa || LONEOS || H || align=right data-sort-value="0.78" | 780 m || 
|-id=496 bgcolor=#FA8072
| 417496 ||  || — || September 19, 2006 || Siding Spring || SSS || H || align=right data-sort-value="0.81" | 810 m || 
|-id=497 bgcolor=#fefefe
| 417497 ||  || — || September 19, 2006 || Kitt Peak || Spacewatch || MAS || align=right data-sort-value="0.75" | 750 m || 
|-id=498 bgcolor=#fefefe
| 417498 ||  || — || September 19, 2006 || Kitt Peak || Spacewatch || — || align=right data-sort-value="0.98" | 980 m || 
|-id=499 bgcolor=#fefefe
| 417499 ||  || — || September 19, 2006 || Kitt Peak || Spacewatch || MAS || align=right data-sort-value="0.71" | 710 m || 
|-id=500 bgcolor=#fefefe
| 417500 ||  || — || September 15, 2006 || Kitt Peak || Spacewatch || — || align=right data-sort-value="0.71" | 710 m || 
|}

417501–417600 

|-bgcolor=#fefefe
| 417501 ||  || — || September 24, 2006 || Kitt Peak || Spacewatch || MAS || align=right data-sort-value="0.71" | 710 m || 
|-id=502 bgcolor=#fefefe
| 417502 ||  || — || September 18, 2006 || Anderson Mesa || LONEOS || NYS || align=right data-sort-value="0.75" | 750 m || 
|-id=503 bgcolor=#fefefe
| 417503 ||  || — || September 17, 2006 || Catalina || CSS || — || align=right | 1.5 km || 
|-id=504 bgcolor=#fefefe
| 417504 ||  || — || September 25, 2006 || Kitt Peak || Spacewatch || — || align=right data-sort-value="0.80" | 800 m || 
|-id=505 bgcolor=#fefefe
| 417505 ||  || — || September 26, 2006 || Mount Lemmon || Mount Lemmon Survey || H || align=right data-sort-value="0.78" | 780 m || 
|-id=506 bgcolor=#fefefe
| 417506 ||  || — || September 16, 2006 || Kitt Peak || Spacewatch || — || align=right data-sort-value="0.77" | 770 m || 
|-id=507 bgcolor=#fefefe
| 417507 ||  || — || September 25, 2006 || Mount Lemmon || Mount Lemmon Survey || — || align=right data-sort-value="0.68" | 680 m || 
|-id=508 bgcolor=#fefefe
| 417508 ||  || — || September 26, 2006 || Kitt Peak || Spacewatch || — || align=right data-sort-value="0.87" | 870 m || 
|-id=509 bgcolor=#fefefe
| 417509 ||  || — || September 26, 2006 || Kitt Peak || Spacewatch || MAS || align=right data-sort-value="0.66" | 660 m || 
|-id=510 bgcolor=#fefefe
| 417510 ||  || — || September 26, 2006 || Mount Lemmon || Mount Lemmon Survey || — || align=right data-sort-value="0.72" | 720 m || 
|-id=511 bgcolor=#fefefe
| 417511 ||  || — || September 26, 2006 || Kitt Peak || Spacewatch || — || align=right data-sort-value="0.90" | 900 m || 
|-id=512 bgcolor=#fefefe
| 417512 ||  || — || September 27, 2006 || Mount Lemmon || Mount Lemmon Survey || — || align=right data-sort-value="0.73" | 730 m || 
|-id=513 bgcolor=#fefefe
| 417513 ||  || — || September 26, 2006 || Socorro || LINEAR || — || align=right data-sort-value="0.83" | 830 m || 
|-id=514 bgcolor=#fefefe
| 417514 ||  || — || September 29, 2006 || Anderson Mesa || LONEOS || — || align=right | 1.6 km || 
|-id=515 bgcolor=#E9E9E9
| 417515 ||  || — || September 19, 2006 || Catalina || CSS || — || align=right | 1.6 km || 
|-id=516 bgcolor=#fefefe
| 417516 ||  || — || September 19, 2006 || Siding Spring || SSS || — || align=right | 1.3 km || 
|-id=517 bgcolor=#E9E9E9
| 417517 ||  || — || September 27, 2006 || Mount Lemmon || Mount Lemmon Survey || — || align=right data-sort-value="0.67" | 670 m || 
|-id=518 bgcolor=#fefefe
| 417518 ||  || — || September 27, 2006 || Kitt Peak || Spacewatch || — || align=right data-sort-value="0.81" | 810 m || 
|-id=519 bgcolor=#fefefe
| 417519 ||  || — || September 28, 2006 || Kitt Peak || Spacewatch || — || align=right | 1.1 km || 
|-id=520 bgcolor=#fefefe
| 417520 ||  || — || September 18, 2006 || Kitt Peak || Spacewatch || MAS || align=right data-sort-value="0.78" | 780 m || 
|-id=521 bgcolor=#fefefe
| 417521 ||  || — || September 30, 2006 || Mount Lemmon || Mount Lemmon Survey || — || align=right data-sort-value="0.95" | 950 m || 
|-id=522 bgcolor=#d6d6d6
| 417522 ||  || — || September 28, 2006 || Mount Lemmon || Mount Lemmon Survey || 3:2 || align=right | 3.8 km || 
|-id=523 bgcolor=#fefefe
| 417523 ||  || — || September 25, 2006 || Mount Lemmon || Mount Lemmon Survey || NYScritical || align=right data-sort-value="0.66" | 660 m || 
|-id=524 bgcolor=#fefefe
| 417524 ||  || — || October 2, 2006 || Mount Lemmon || Mount Lemmon Survey || — || align=right data-sort-value="0.75" | 750 m || 
|-id=525 bgcolor=#fefefe
| 417525 ||  || — || October 12, 2006 || Kitt Peak || Spacewatch || — || align=right data-sort-value="0.84" | 840 m || 
|-id=526 bgcolor=#E9E9E9
| 417526 ||  || — || October 12, 2006 || Kitt Peak || Spacewatch || — || align=right data-sort-value="0.72" | 720 m || 
|-id=527 bgcolor=#d6d6d6
| 417527 ||  || — || September 25, 2006 || Mount Lemmon || Mount Lemmon Survey || SHU3:2 || align=right | 4.9 km || 
|-id=528 bgcolor=#fefefe
| 417528 ||  || — || October 12, 2006 || Kitt Peak || Spacewatch || — || align=right data-sort-value="0.97" | 970 m || 
|-id=529 bgcolor=#E9E9E9
| 417529 ||  || — || October 12, 2006 || Kitt Peak || Spacewatch || — || align=right data-sort-value="0.97" | 970 m || 
|-id=530 bgcolor=#E9E9E9
| 417530 ||  || — || September 30, 2006 || Mount Lemmon || Mount Lemmon Survey || — || align=right | 1.3 km || 
|-id=531 bgcolor=#E9E9E9
| 417531 ||  || — || October 12, 2006 || Kitt Peak || Spacewatch || — || align=right data-sort-value="0.78" | 780 m || 
|-id=532 bgcolor=#E9E9E9
| 417532 ||  || — || September 28, 2006 || Mount Lemmon || Mount Lemmon Survey || — || align=right data-sort-value="0.85" | 850 m || 
|-id=533 bgcolor=#fefefe
| 417533 ||  || — || October 11, 2006 || Palomar || NEAT || — || align=right data-sort-value="0.84" | 840 m || 
|-id=534 bgcolor=#fefefe
| 417534 ||  || — || October 13, 2006 || Kitt Peak || Spacewatch || — || align=right data-sort-value="0.91" | 910 m || 
|-id=535 bgcolor=#fefefe
| 417535 ||  || — || October 13, 2006 || Kitt Peak || Spacewatch || — || align=right data-sort-value="0.79" | 790 m || 
|-id=536 bgcolor=#fefefe
| 417536 ||  || — || October 15, 2006 || Kitt Peak || Spacewatch || — || align=right | 1.1 km || 
|-id=537 bgcolor=#fefefe
| 417537 ||  || — || October 15, 2006 || Kitt Peak || Spacewatch || — || align=right data-sort-value="0.98" | 980 m || 
|-id=538 bgcolor=#fefefe
| 417538 ||  || — || October 12, 2006 || Apache Point || A. C. Becker || — || align=right data-sort-value="0.85" | 850 m || 
|-id=539 bgcolor=#E9E9E9
| 417539 ||  || — || October 12, 2006 || Kitt Peak || Spacewatch || — || align=right data-sort-value="0.86" | 860 m || 
|-id=540 bgcolor=#E9E9E9
| 417540 ||  || — || October 2, 2006 || Mount Lemmon || Mount Lemmon Survey || — || align=right | 1.0 km || 
|-id=541 bgcolor=#E9E9E9
| 417541 ||  || — || October 4, 2006 || Mount Lemmon || Mount Lemmon Survey || — || align=right data-sort-value="0.74" | 740 m || 
|-id=542 bgcolor=#fefefe
| 417542 ||  || — || October 16, 2006 || Catalina || CSS || MAS || align=right data-sort-value="0.75" | 750 m || 
|-id=543 bgcolor=#fefefe
| 417543 ||  || — || October 16, 2006 || Kitt Peak || Spacewatch || — || align=right data-sort-value="0.65" | 650 m || 
|-id=544 bgcolor=#E9E9E9
| 417544 ||  || — || September 27, 2006 || Mount Lemmon || Mount Lemmon Survey || (194) || align=right | 1.8 km || 
|-id=545 bgcolor=#fefefe
| 417545 ||  || — || October 16, 2006 || Catalina || CSS || H || align=right data-sort-value="0.71" | 710 m || 
|-id=546 bgcolor=#d6d6d6
| 417546 ||  || — || July 15, 2005 || Mount Lemmon || Mount Lemmon Survey || SHU3:2 || align=right | 4.6 km || 
|-id=547 bgcolor=#E9E9E9
| 417547 ||  || — || September 30, 2006 || Mount Lemmon || Mount Lemmon Survey || — || align=right | 1.3 km || 
|-id=548 bgcolor=#E9E9E9
| 417548 ||  || — || September 28, 2006 || Mount Lemmon || Mount Lemmon Survey || — || align=right data-sort-value="0.77" | 770 m || 
|-id=549 bgcolor=#fefefe
| 417549 ||  || — || October 17, 2006 || Kitt Peak || Spacewatch || (2076) || align=right data-sort-value="0.89" | 890 m || 
|-id=550 bgcolor=#FA8072
| 417550 ||  || — || September 28, 2006 || Mount Lemmon || Mount Lemmon Survey || H || align=right data-sort-value="0.78" | 780 m || 
|-id=551 bgcolor=#fefefe
| 417551 ||  || — || October 19, 2006 || Mount Lemmon || Mount Lemmon Survey || — || align=right data-sort-value="0.92" | 920 m || 
|-id=552 bgcolor=#E9E9E9
| 417552 ||  || — || October 17, 2006 || Kitt Peak || Spacewatch || — || align=right data-sort-value="0.90" | 900 m || 
|-id=553 bgcolor=#E9E9E9
| 417553 ||  || — || September 25, 2006 || Mount Lemmon || Mount Lemmon Survey || — || align=right data-sort-value="0.77" | 770 m || 
|-id=554 bgcolor=#E9E9E9
| 417554 ||  || — || October 17, 2006 || Kitt Peak || Spacewatch || — || align=right data-sort-value="0.96" | 960 m || 
|-id=555 bgcolor=#E9E9E9
| 417555 ||  || — || September 27, 2006 || Mount Lemmon || Mount Lemmon Survey || — || align=right data-sort-value="0.82" | 820 m || 
|-id=556 bgcolor=#d6d6d6
| 417556 ||  || — || October 17, 2006 || Kitt Peak || Spacewatch || 3:2 || align=right | 4.0 km || 
|-id=557 bgcolor=#fefefe
| 417557 ||  || — || October 2, 2006 || Mount Lemmon || Mount Lemmon Survey || — || align=right data-sort-value="0.69" | 690 m || 
|-id=558 bgcolor=#E9E9E9
| 417558 ||  || — || October 3, 2006 || Mount Lemmon || Mount Lemmon Survey || (5) || align=right data-sort-value="0.71" | 710 m || 
|-id=559 bgcolor=#fefefe
| 417559 ||  || — || September 16, 2006 || Kitt Peak || Spacewatch || — || align=right data-sort-value="0.62" | 620 m || 
|-id=560 bgcolor=#E9E9E9
| 417560 ||  || — || October 19, 2006 || Kitt Peak || Spacewatch || — || align=right | 1.8 km || 
|-id=561 bgcolor=#E9E9E9
| 417561 ||  || — || October 19, 2006 || Kitt Peak || Spacewatch || — || align=right data-sort-value="0.76" | 760 m || 
|-id=562 bgcolor=#fefefe
| 417562 ||  || — || October 19, 2006 || Kitt Peak || Spacewatch || — || align=right data-sort-value="0.92" | 920 m || 
|-id=563 bgcolor=#E9E9E9
| 417563 ||  || — || October 19, 2006 || Palomar || NEAT || — || align=right | 1.1 km || 
|-id=564 bgcolor=#fefefe
| 417564 ||  || — || October 21, 2006 || Mount Lemmon || Mount Lemmon Survey || — || align=right data-sort-value="0.73" | 730 m || 
|-id=565 bgcolor=#fefefe
| 417565 ||  || — || October 19, 2006 || Mount Lemmon || Mount Lemmon Survey || — || align=right data-sort-value="0.93" | 930 m || 
|-id=566 bgcolor=#fefefe
| 417566 ||  || — || October 28, 2006 || Catalina || CSS || H || align=right data-sort-value="0.98" | 980 m || 
|-id=567 bgcolor=#fefefe
| 417567 ||  || — || October 20, 2006 || Kitt Peak || Spacewatch || — || align=right data-sort-value="0.72" | 720 m || 
|-id=568 bgcolor=#fefefe
| 417568 ||  || — || October 20, 2006 || Kitt Peak || Spacewatch || — || align=right | 1.1 km || 
|-id=569 bgcolor=#E9E9E9
| 417569 ||  || — || October 23, 2006 || Kitt Peak || Spacewatch || — || align=right data-sort-value="0.98" | 980 m || 
|-id=570 bgcolor=#fefefe
| 417570 ||  || — || October 23, 2006 || Kitt Peak || Spacewatch || V || align=right data-sort-value="0.85" | 850 m || 
|-id=571 bgcolor=#E9E9E9
| 417571 ||  || — || October 17, 2006 || Andrushivka || Andrushivka Obs. || — || align=right | 2.0 km || 
|-id=572 bgcolor=#E9E9E9
| 417572 ||  || — || October 21, 2006 || Kitt Peak || Spacewatch || — || align=right | 2.6 km || 
|-id=573 bgcolor=#fefefe
| 417573 ||  || — || October 22, 2006 || Kitt Peak || Spacewatch || — || align=right data-sort-value="0.64" | 640 m || 
|-id=574 bgcolor=#E9E9E9
| 417574 ||  || — || October 27, 2006 || Mount Lemmon || Mount Lemmon Survey || — || align=right data-sort-value="0.79" | 790 m || 
|-id=575 bgcolor=#E9E9E9
| 417575 ||  || — || October 27, 2006 || Mount Lemmon || Mount Lemmon Survey || — || align=right | 1.3 km || 
|-id=576 bgcolor=#fefefe
| 417576 ||  || — || October 27, 2006 || Mount Lemmon || Mount Lemmon Survey || — || align=right data-sort-value="0.77" | 770 m || 
|-id=577 bgcolor=#fefefe
| 417577 ||  || — || October 27, 2006 || Kitt Peak || Spacewatch || — || align=right data-sort-value="0.92" | 920 m || 
|-id=578 bgcolor=#fefefe
| 417578 ||  || — || October 21, 2006 || Catalina || CSS || H || align=right data-sort-value="0.93" | 930 m || 
|-id=579 bgcolor=#fefefe
| 417579 ||  || — || October 21, 2006 || Catalina || CSS || — || align=right | 1.5 km || 
|-id=580 bgcolor=#E9E9E9
| 417580 ||  || — || October 31, 2006 || Mount Lemmon || Mount Lemmon Survey || — || align=right | 2.7 km || 
|-id=581 bgcolor=#FFC2E0
| 417581 ||  || — || November 11, 2006 || Mount Lemmon || Mount Lemmon Survey || APO +1km || align=right | 1.2 km || 
|-id=582 bgcolor=#E9E9E9
| 417582 ||  || — || November 9, 2006 || Kitt Peak || Spacewatch || — || align=right | 1.1 km || 
|-id=583 bgcolor=#fefefe
| 417583 ||  || — || November 10, 2006 || Kitt Peak || Spacewatch || H || align=right data-sort-value="0.71" | 710 m || 
|-id=584 bgcolor=#fefefe
| 417584 ||  || — || November 11, 2006 || Mount Lemmon || Mount Lemmon Survey || — || align=right data-sort-value="0.95" | 950 m || 
|-id=585 bgcolor=#d6d6d6
| 417585 ||  || — || November 9, 2006 || Kitt Peak || Spacewatch || SHU3:2 || align=right | 4.8 km || 
|-id=586 bgcolor=#fefefe
| 417586 ||  || — || November 10, 2006 || Kitt Peak || Spacewatch || — || align=right | 1.4 km || 
|-id=587 bgcolor=#fefefe
| 417587 ||  || — || November 9, 2006 || Altschwendt || W. Ries || NYS || align=right data-sort-value="0.59" | 590 m || 
|-id=588 bgcolor=#fefefe
| 417588 ||  || — || November 10, 2006 || Kitt Peak || Spacewatch || — || align=right data-sort-value="0.75" | 750 m || 
|-id=589 bgcolor=#E9E9E9
| 417589 ||  || — || November 11, 2006 || Kitt Peak || Spacewatch || — || align=right data-sort-value="0.78" | 780 m || 
|-id=590 bgcolor=#E9E9E9
| 417590 ||  || — || October 4, 2006 || Mount Lemmon || Mount Lemmon Survey || — || align=right data-sort-value="0.96" | 960 m || 
|-id=591 bgcolor=#fefefe
| 417591 ||  || — || November 11, 2006 || Kitt Peak || Spacewatch || MAS || align=right data-sort-value="0.77" | 770 m || 
|-id=592 bgcolor=#E9E9E9
| 417592 ||  || — || November 11, 2006 || Kitt Peak || Spacewatch || — || align=right | 1.5 km || 
|-id=593 bgcolor=#E9E9E9
| 417593 ||  || — || November 13, 2006 || Kitt Peak || Spacewatch || EUN || align=right | 1.1 km || 
|-id=594 bgcolor=#fefefe
| 417594 ||  || — || November 14, 2006 || Catalina || CSS || — || align=right | 1.1 km || 
|-id=595 bgcolor=#E9E9E9
| 417595 ||  || — || October 23, 2006 || Mount Lemmon || Mount Lemmon Survey || (5) || align=right data-sort-value="0.73" | 730 m || 
|-id=596 bgcolor=#E9E9E9
| 417596 ||  || — || November 13, 2006 || Catalina || CSS || — || align=right | 1.4 km || 
|-id=597 bgcolor=#E9E9E9
| 417597 ||  || — || November 13, 2006 || Kitt Peak || Spacewatch || (5) || align=right data-sort-value="0.78" | 780 m || 
|-id=598 bgcolor=#fefefe
| 417598 ||  || — || November 14, 2006 || Kitt Peak || Spacewatch || — || align=right | 1.1 km || 
|-id=599 bgcolor=#E9E9E9
| 417599 ||  || — || November 1, 2006 || Mount Lemmon || Mount Lemmon Survey || — || align=right data-sort-value="0.82" | 820 m || 
|-id=600 bgcolor=#E9E9E9
| 417600 ||  || — || November 1, 2006 || Mount Lemmon || Mount Lemmon Survey || — || align=right data-sort-value="0.86" | 860 m || 
|}

417601–417700 

|-bgcolor=#fefefe
| 417601 ||  || — || November 15, 2006 || Kitt Peak || Spacewatch || — || align=right data-sort-value="0.99" | 990 m || 
|-id=602 bgcolor=#E9E9E9
| 417602 ||  || — || November 15, 2006 || Kitt Peak || Spacewatch || — || align=right data-sort-value="0.85" | 850 m || 
|-id=603 bgcolor=#E9E9E9
| 417603 ||  || — || November 11, 2006 || Mount Lemmon || Mount Lemmon Survey || — || align=right data-sort-value="0.74" | 740 m || 
|-id=604 bgcolor=#fefefe
| 417604 ||  || — || November 15, 2006 || Kitt Peak || Spacewatch || — || align=right data-sort-value="0.87" | 870 m || 
|-id=605 bgcolor=#E9E9E9
| 417605 ||  || — || November 15, 2006 || Kitt Peak || Spacewatch || — || align=right | 1.1 km || 
|-id=606 bgcolor=#E9E9E9
| 417606 ||  || — || November 15, 2006 || Mount Lemmon || Mount Lemmon Survey || — || align=right | 1.2 km || 
|-id=607 bgcolor=#fefefe
| 417607 ||  || — || November 17, 2006 || Catalina || CSS || H || align=right data-sort-value="0.57" | 570 m || 
|-id=608 bgcolor=#E9E9E9
| 417608 ||  || — || November 20, 2006 || 7300 Observatory || W. K. Y. Yeung || (1547) || align=right | 1.4 km || 
|-id=609 bgcolor=#fefefe
| 417609 ||  || — || November 17, 2006 || Mount Lemmon || Mount Lemmon Survey || — || align=right data-sort-value="0.96" | 960 m || 
|-id=610 bgcolor=#fefefe
| 417610 ||  || — || November 17, 2006 || Mount Lemmon || Mount Lemmon Survey || — || align=right data-sort-value="0.94" | 940 m || 
|-id=611 bgcolor=#d6d6d6
| 417611 ||  || — || November 17, 2006 || Mount Lemmon || Mount Lemmon Survey || 3:2 || align=right | 4.4 km || 
|-id=612 bgcolor=#FFC2E0
| 417612 ||  || — || November 22, 2006 || Mount Lemmon || Mount Lemmon Survey || APOPHA || align=right data-sort-value="0.74" | 740 m || 
|-id=613 bgcolor=#E9E9E9
| 417613 ||  || — || November 16, 2006 || Kitt Peak || Spacewatch || — || align=right data-sort-value="0.98" | 980 m || 
|-id=614 bgcolor=#E9E9E9
| 417614 ||  || — || November 16, 2006 || Mount Lemmon || Mount Lemmon Survey || — || align=right | 1.4 km || 
|-id=615 bgcolor=#E9E9E9
| 417615 ||  || — || November 16, 2006 || Kitt Peak || Spacewatch || — || align=right | 1.1 km || 
|-id=616 bgcolor=#fefefe
| 417616 ||  || — || November 18, 2006 || Socorro || LINEAR || — || align=right | 1.00 km || 
|-id=617 bgcolor=#E9E9E9
| 417617 ||  || — || October 23, 2006 || Mount Lemmon || Mount Lemmon Survey || (5) || align=right data-sort-value="0.69" | 690 m || 
|-id=618 bgcolor=#d6d6d6
| 417618 ||  || — || October 22, 2006 || Mount Lemmon || Mount Lemmon Survey || 3:2 || align=right | 4.4 km || 
|-id=619 bgcolor=#E9E9E9
| 417619 ||  || — || October 23, 2006 || Mount Lemmon || Mount Lemmon Survey || — || align=right | 1.1 km || 
|-id=620 bgcolor=#E9E9E9
| 417620 ||  || — || November 19, 2006 || Catalina || CSS || — || align=right | 1.8 km || 
|-id=621 bgcolor=#E9E9E9
| 417621 ||  || — || October 28, 2006 || Mount Lemmon || Mount Lemmon Survey || — || align=right data-sort-value="0.75" | 750 m || 
|-id=622 bgcolor=#E9E9E9
| 417622 ||  || — || November 20, 2006 || Kitt Peak || Spacewatch || EUN || align=right | 1.3 km || 
|-id=623 bgcolor=#E9E9E9
| 417623 ||  || — || November 20, 2006 || Kitt Peak || Spacewatch || — || align=right data-sort-value="0.87" | 870 m || 
|-id=624 bgcolor=#E9E9E9
| 417624 ||  || — || November 20, 2006 || Kitt Peak || Spacewatch || — || align=right | 1.3 km || 
|-id=625 bgcolor=#E9E9E9
| 417625 ||  || — || November 13, 2006 || Mount Lemmon || Mount Lemmon Survey || — || align=right | 1.00 km || 
|-id=626 bgcolor=#E9E9E9
| 417626 ||  || — || November 11, 2006 || Kitt Peak || Spacewatch || — || align=right data-sort-value="0.94" | 940 m || 
|-id=627 bgcolor=#E9E9E9
| 417627 ||  || — || November 23, 2006 || Kitt Peak || Spacewatch || — || align=right | 1.2 km || 
|-id=628 bgcolor=#E9E9E9
| 417628 ||  || — || November 11, 2006 || Mount Lemmon || Mount Lemmon Survey || (194) || align=right | 1.1 km || 
|-id=629 bgcolor=#fefefe
| 417629 ||  || — || November 24, 2006 || Mount Lemmon || Mount Lemmon Survey || — || align=right | 1.0 km || 
|-id=630 bgcolor=#fefefe
| 417630 ||  || — || November 24, 2006 || Kitt Peak || Spacewatch || H || align=right data-sort-value="0.94" | 940 m || 
|-id=631 bgcolor=#E9E9E9
| 417631 ||  || — || November 25, 2006 || Mount Lemmon || Mount Lemmon Survey || — || align=right | 1.1 km || 
|-id=632 bgcolor=#E9E9E9
| 417632 ||  || — || November 27, 2006 || Mount Lemmon || Mount Lemmon Survey || — || align=right data-sort-value="0.92" | 920 m || 
|-id=633 bgcolor=#fefefe
| 417633 ||  || — || November 25, 2006 || Catalina || CSS || — || align=right | 1.2 km || 
|-id=634 bgcolor=#FFC2E0
| 417634 ||  || — || December 11, 2006 || Catalina || CSS || APOPHAcritical || align=right data-sort-value="0.42" | 420 m || 
|-id=635 bgcolor=#E9E9E9
| 417635 ||  || — || December 9, 2006 || Kitt Peak || Spacewatch || — || align=right | 2.1 km || 
|-id=636 bgcolor=#E9E9E9
| 417636 ||  || — || December 9, 2006 || Kitt Peak || Spacewatch || — || align=right | 1.2 km || 
|-id=637 bgcolor=#E9E9E9
| 417637 ||  || — || November 25, 2006 || Mount Lemmon || Mount Lemmon Survey || EUN || align=right | 1.2 km || 
|-id=638 bgcolor=#fefefe
| 417638 ||  || — || December 13, 2006 || Kitt Peak || Spacewatch || — || align=right data-sort-value="0.91" | 910 m || 
|-id=639 bgcolor=#E9E9E9
| 417639 ||  || — || December 11, 2006 || Kitt Peak || Spacewatch || — || align=right | 1.4 km || 
|-id=640 bgcolor=#E9E9E9
| 417640 ||  || — || December 12, 2006 || Mount Lemmon || Mount Lemmon Survey || — || align=right | 1.3 km || 
|-id=641 bgcolor=#E9E9E9
| 417641 ||  || — || December 6, 2002 || Socorro || LINEAR || — || align=right data-sort-value="0.96" | 960 m || 
|-id=642 bgcolor=#E9E9E9
| 417642 ||  || — || December 11, 2006 || Kitt Peak || Spacewatch || — || align=right | 1.0 km || 
|-id=643 bgcolor=#fefefe
| 417643 ||  || — || October 28, 2006 || Mount Lemmon || Mount Lemmon Survey || V || align=right data-sort-value="0.76" | 760 m || 
|-id=644 bgcolor=#fefefe
| 417644 ||  || — || November 22, 2006 || Catalina || CSS || H || align=right data-sort-value="0.83" | 830 m || 
|-id=645 bgcolor=#E9E9E9
| 417645 ||  || — || December 14, 2006 || Mount Lemmon || Mount Lemmon Survey || — || align=right | 2.3 km || 
|-id=646 bgcolor=#E9E9E9
| 417646 ||  || — || December 14, 2006 || Palomar || NEAT || — || align=right | 1.5 km || 
|-id=647 bgcolor=#E9E9E9
| 417647 ||  || — || December 14, 2006 || Palomar || NEAT || — || align=right | 1.2 km || 
|-id=648 bgcolor=#E9E9E9
| 417648 ||  || — || December 13, 2006 || Mount Lemmon || Mount Lemmon Survey || — || align=right | 1.8 km || 
|-id=649 bgcolor=#E9E9E9
| 417649 ||  || — || December 13, 2006 || Mount Lemmon || Mount Lemmon Survey || — || align=right | 2.2 km || 
|-id=650 bgcolor=#E9E9E9
| 417650 ||  || — || December 15, 2006 || Kitt Peak || Spacewatch || — || align=right | 2.1 km || 
|-id=651 bgcolor=#fefefe
| 417651 ||  || — || December 1, 2006 || Kitt Peak || Spacewatch || — || align=right data-sort-value="0.90" | 900 m || 
|-id=652 bgcolor=#fefefe
| 417652 ||  || — || November 20, 2006 || Catalina || CSS || H || align=right data-sort-value="0.93" | 930 m || 
|-id=653 bgcolor=#fefefe
| 417653 ||  || — || December 20, 2006 || Palomar || NEAT || — || align=right | 1.3 km || 
|-id=654 bgcolor=#E9E9E9
| 417654 ||  || — || November 21, 2006 || Mount Lemmon || Mount Lemmon Survey || MAR || align=right | 1.2 km || 
|-id=655 bgcolor=#FFC2E0
| 417655 ||  || — || December 26, 2006 || Siding Spring || SSS || ATE || align=right data-sort-value="0.36" | 360 m || 
|-id=656 bgcolor=#E9E9E9
| 417656 ||  || — || December 21, 2006 || Anderson Mesa || LONEOS || — || align=right | 1.2 km || 
|-id=657 bgcolor=#E9E9E9
| 417657 ||  || — || October 22, 2006 || Mount Lemmon || Mount Lemmon Survey || (5) || align=right data-sort-value="0.80" | 800 m || 
|-id=658 bgcolor=#fefefe
| 417658 ||  || — || December 21, 2006 || Kitt Peak || Spacewatch || — || align=right data-sort-value="0.74" | 740 m || 
|-id=659 bgcolor=#E9E9E9
| 417659 ||  || — || December 21, 2006 || Kitt Peak || Spacewatch || RAF || align=right data-sort-value="0.95" | 950 m || 
|-id=660 bgcolor=#E9E9E9
| 417660 ||  || — || December 10, 2006 || Kitt Peak || Spacewatch || ADE || align=right | 2.1 km || 
|-id=661 bgcolor=#E9E9E9
| 417661 ||  || — || December 21, 2006 || Kitt Peak || Spacewatch || — || align=right | 1.1 km || 
|-id=662 bgcolor=#E9E9E9
| 417662 ||  || — || December 21, 2006 || Kitt Peak || Spacewatch || — || align=right | 1.2 km || 
|-id=663 bgcolor=#E9E9E9
| 417663 ||  || — || November 21, 2006 || Mount Lemmon || Mount Lemmon Survey || — || align=right data-sort-value="0.79" | 790 m || 
|-id=664 bgcolor=#E9E9E9
| 417664 ||  || — || December 21, 2006 || Kitt Peak || Spacewatch || — || align=right | 2.1 km || 
|-id=665 bgcolor=#fefefe
| 417665 ||  || — || December 25, 2006 || Catalina || CSS || H || align=right data-sort-value="0.74" | 740 m || 
|-id=666 bgcolor=#E9E9E9
| 417666 ||  || — || December 27, 2006 || Mount Lemmon || Mount Lemmon Survey || (5) || align=right data-sort-value="0.74" | 740 m || 
|-id=667 bgcolor=#E9E9E9
| 417667 ||  || — || January 8, 2007 || Catalina || CSS || — || align=right | 1.9 km || 
|-id=668 bgcolor=#E9E9E9
| 417668 ||  || — || December 21, 2006 || Mount Lemmon || Mount Lemmon Survey || — || align=right | 2.4 km || 
|-id=669 bgcolor=#E9E9E9
| 417669 ||  || — || January 8, 2007 || Kitt Peak || Spacewatch || — || align=right | 2.2 km || 
|-id=670 bgcolor=#E9E9E9
| 417670 ||  || — || January 8, 2007 || Mount Lemmon || Mount Lemmon Survey || — || align=right data-sort-value="0.95" | 950 m || 
|-id=671 bgcolor=#fefefe
| 417671 ||  || — || January 8, 2007 || Kitt Peak || Spacewatch || H || align=right data-sort-value="0.96" | 960 m || 
|-id=672 bgcolor=#E9E9E9
| 417672 ||  || — || January 9, 2007 || Mount Lemmon || Mount Lemmon Survey || (5) || align=right data-sort-value="0.95" | 950 m || 
|-id=673 bgcolor=#E9E9E9
| 417673 ||  || — || November 27, 2006 || Mount Lemmon || Mount Lemmon Survey || JUN || align=right | 1.1 km || 
|-id=674 bgcolor=#E9E9E9
| 417674 ||  || — || January 9, 2007 || Mount Lemmon || Mount Lemmon Survey || — || align=right data-sort-value="0.89" | 890 m || 
|-id=675 bgcolor=#E9E9E9
| 417675 ||  || — || December 14, 2006 || Mount Lemmon || Mount Lemmon Survey || — || align=right | 1.9 km || 
|-id=676 bgcolor=#E9E9E9
| 417676 ||  || — || December 13, 2006 || Kitt Peak || Spacewatch || — || align=right | 3.2 km || 
|-id=677 bgcolor=#E9E9E9
| 417677 ||  || — || January 10, 2007 || Kitt Peak || Spacewatch || — || align=right | 1.3 km || 
|-id=678 bgcolor=#E9E9E9
| 417678 ||  || — || December 25, 2006 || Catalina || CSS || — || align=right | 1.3 km || 
|-id=679 bgcolor=#E9E9E9
| 417679 ||  || — || January 15, 2007 || Catalina || CSS || — || align=right data-sort-value="0.95" | 950 m || 
|-id=680 bgcolor=#E9E9E9
| 417680 ||  || — || January 9, 2007 || Mount Lemmon || Mount Lemmon Survey || — || align=right | 1.2 km || 
|-id=681 bgcolor=#E9E9E9
| 417681 ||  || — || January 10, 2007 || Kitt Peak || Spacewatch || — || align=right data-sort-value="0.71" | 710 m || 
|-id=682 bgcolor=#E9E9E9
| 417682 ||  || — || January 9, 2007 || Mount Lemmon || Mount Lemmon Survey || — || align=right data-sort-value="0.79" | 790 m || 
|-id=683 bgcolor=#E9E9E9
| 417683 ||  || — || January 10, 2007 || Charleston || ARO || — || align=right | 1.8 km || 
|-id=684 bgcolor=#fefefe
| 417684 ||  || — || January 16, 2007 || Catalina || CSS || H || align=right | 1.1 km || 
|-id=685 bgcolor=#E9E9E9
| 417685 ||  || — || December 24, 2006 || Catalina || CSS || (5) || align=right data-sort-value="0.86" | 860 m || 
|-id=686 bgcolor=#E9E9E9
| 417686 ||  || — || January 17, 2007 || Kitt Peak || Spacewatch || — || align=right | 1.6 km || 
|-id=687 bgcolor=#E9E9E9
| 417687 ||  || — || January 17, 2007 || Kitt Peak || Spacewatch || — || align=right | 1.7 km || 
|-id=688 bgcolor=#E9E9E9
| 417688 ||  || — || November 21, 2006 || Mount Lemmon || Mount Lemmon Survey || — || align=right data-sort-value="0.81" | 810 m || 
|-id=689 bgcolor=#d6d6d6
| 417689 ||  || — || November 20, 2006 || Mount Lemmon || Mount Lemmon Survey || 3:2 || align=right | 4.2 km || 
|-id=690 bgcolor=#E9E9E9
| 417690 ||  || — || January 16, 2007 || Socorro || LINEAR || — || align=right data-sort-value="0.95" | 950 m || 
|-id=691 bgcolor=#E9E9E9
| 417691 ||  || — || January 26, 2007 || Kitt Peak || Spacewatch || — || align=right | 1.6 km || 
|-id=692 bgcolor=#E9E9E9
| 417692 ||  || — || January 10, 2007 || Kitt Peak || Spacewatch || — || align=right | 1.2 km || 
|-id=693 bgcolor=#E9E9E9
| 417693 ||  || — || January 24, 2007 || Kitt Peak || Spacewatch || — || align=right data-sort-value="0.98" | 980 m || 
|-id=694 bgcolor=#E9E9E9
| 417694 ||  || — || November 27, 2006 || Mount Lemmon || Mount Lemmon Survey || — || align=right data-sort-value="0.84" | 840 m || 
|-id=695 bgcolor=#E9E9E9
| 417695 ||  || — || November 1, 2006 || Mount Lemmon || Mount Lemmon Survey || — || align=right data-sort-value="0.98" | 980 m || 
|-id=696 bgcolor=#fefefe
| 417696 ||  || — || June 4, 2005 || Catalina || CSS || H || align=right data-sort-value="0.95" | 950 m || 
|-id=697 bgcolor=#E9E9E9
| 417697 ||  || — || January 24, 2007 || Socorro || LINEAR || — || align=right | 2.0 km || 
|-id=698 bgcolor=#E9E9E9
| 417698 ||  || — || January 24, 2007 || Catalina || CSS || JUN || align=right | 1.4 km || 
|-id=699 bgcolor=#E9E9E9
| 417699 ||  || — || January 26, 2007 || Anderson Mesa || LONEOS || — || align=right | 1.1 km || 
|-id=700 bgcolor=#E9E9E9
| 417700 ||  || — || January 27, 2007 || Mount Lemmon || Mount Lemmon Survey || — || align=right | 1.2 km || 
|}

417701–417800 

|-bgcolor=#E9E9E9
| 417701 ||  || — || January 27, 2007 || Mount Lemmon || Mount Lemmon Survey || PAD || align=right | 1.8 km || 
|-id=702 bgcolor=#E9E9E9
| 417702 ||  || — || January 27, 2007 || Kitt Peak || Spacewatch || — || align=right | 2.1 km || 
|-id=703 bgcolor=#E9E9E9
| 417703 ||  || — || November 25, 2006 || Mount Lemmon || Mount Lemmon Survey || — || align=right | 1.4 km || 
|-id=704 bgcolor=#E9E9E9
| 417704 ||  || — || January 28, 2007 || Mount Lemmon || Mount Lemmon Survey || — || align=right | 1.4 km || 
|-id=705 bgcolor=#E9E9E9
| 417705 ||  || — || January 27, 2007 || Mount Lemmon || Mount Lemmon Survey || — || align=right | 1.7 km || 
|-id=706 bgcolor=#E9E9E9
| 417706 ||  || — || January 27, 2007 || Kitt Peak || Spacewatch || — || align=right | 2.5 km || 
|-id=707 bgcolor=#E9E9E9
| 417707 ||  || — || January 27, 2007 || Mount Lemmon || Mount Lemmon Survey || — || align=right data-sort-value="0.81" | 810 m || 
|-id=708 bgcolor=#E9E9E9
| 417708 ||  || — || January 19, 2007 || Mauna Kea || Mauna Kea Obs. || — || align=right | 1.4 km || 
|-id=709 bgcolor=#E9E9E9
| 417709 ||  || — || December 14, 2006 || Mount Lemmon || Mount Lemmon Survey || EUN || align=right | 1.1 km || 
|-id=710 bgcolor=#E9E9E9
| 417710 ||  || — || February 6, 2007 || Palomar || NEAT || (5) || align=right data-sort-value="0.86" | 860 m || 
|-id=711 bgcolor=#E9E9E9
| 417711 ||  || — || December 21, 2006 || Mount Lemmon || Mount Lemmon Survey || — || align=right data-sort-value="0.98" | 980 m || 
|-id=712 bgcolor=#E9E9E9
| 417712 ||  || — || November 28, 2006 || Mount Lemmon || Mount Lemmon Survey || — || align=right | 1.3 km || 
|-id=713 bgcolor=#E9E9E9
| 417713 ||  || — || February 6, 2007 || Mount Lemmon || Mount Lemmon Survey || — || align=right | 1.3 km || 
|-id=714 bgcolor=#E9E9E9
| 417714 ||  || — || November 22, 2006 || Mount Lemmon || Mount Lemmon Survey || EUN || align=right | 1.3 km || 
|-id=715 bgcolor=#E9E9E9
| 417715 ||  || — || February 7, 2007 || Kitt Peak || Spacewatch || — || align=right | 2.1 km || 
|-id=716 bgcolor=#E9E9E9
| 417716 ||  || — || January 17, 2007 || Catalina || CSS || — || align=right | 1.2 km || 
|-id=717 bgcolor=#E9E9E9
| 417717 ||  || — || February 6, 2007 || Palomar || NEAT || — || align=right | 1.0 km || 
|-id=718 bgcolor=#E9E9E9
| 417718 ||  || — || February 6, 2007 || Palomar || NEAT || — || align=right | 2.1 km || 
|-id=719 bgcolor=#E9E9E9
| 417719 ||  || — || November 21, 2006 || Mount Lemmon || Mount Lemmon Survey || — || align=right | 1.8 km || 
|-id=720 bgcolor=#E9E9E9
| 417720 ||  || — || November 22, 2006 || Mount Lemmon || Mount Lemmon Survey || — || align=right data-sort-value="0.94" | 940 m || 
|-id=721 bgcolor=#E9E9E9
| 417721 ||  || — || February 6, 2007 || Mount Lemmon || Mount Lemmon Survey || — || align=right | 1.6 km || 
|-id=722 bgcolor=#E9E9E9
| 417722 ||  || — || February 7, 2007 || Palomar || NEAT || — || align=right data-sort-value="0.83" | 830 m || 
|-id=723 bgcolor=#E9E9E9
| 417723 ||  || — || December 24, 2006 || Kitt Peak || Spacewatch || — || align=right | 2.2 km || 
|-id=724 bgcolor=#E9E9E9
| 417724 ||  || — || November 22, 2006 || Mount Lemmon || Mount Lemmon Survey || — || align=right | 1.9 km || 
|-id=725 bgcolor=#d6d6d6
| 417725 ||  || — || January 10, 2007 || Mount Lemmon || Mount Lemmon Survey || 3:2 || align=right | 5.6 km || 
|-id=726 bgcolor=#E9E9E9
| 417726 ||  || — || February 6, 2007 || Mount Lemmon || Mount Lemmon Survey || EUN || align=right | 1.4 km || 
|-id=727 bgcolor=#E9E9E9
| 417727 ||  || — || January 27, 2007 || Kitt Peak || Spacewatch || — || align=right | 2.6 km || 
|-id=728 bgcolor=#E9E9E9
| 417728 ||  || — || December 23, 2006 || Mount Lemmon || Mount Lemmon Survey || — || align=right | 1.6 km || 
|-id=729 bgcolor=#E9E9E9
| 417729 ||  || — || December 27, 2006 || Mount Lemmon || Mount Lemmon Survey || — || align=right | 1.4 km || 
|-id=730 bgcolor=#E9E9E9
| 417730 ||  || — || February 7, 2007 || Mount Lemmon || Mount Lemmon Survey || — || align=right | 1.6 km || 
|-id=731 bgcolor=#E9E9E9
| 417731 ||  || — || August 25, 2001 || Kitt Peak || Spacewatch || — || align=right data-sort-value="0.79" | 790 m || 
|-id=732 bgcolor=#E9E9E9
| 417732 ||  || — || February 8, 2007 || Kitt Peak || Spacewatch || — || align=right | 1.5 km || 
|-id=733 bgcolor=#E9E9E9
| 417733 ||  || — || February 10, 2007 || Mount Lemmon || Mount Lemmon Survey || — || align=right | 1.3 km || 
|-id=734 bgcolor=#E9E9E9
| 417734 ||  || — || January 17, 2007 || Catalina || CSS || — || align=right | 2.3 km || 
|-id=735 bgcolor=#E9E9E9
| 417735 ||  || — || February 15, 2007 || Catalina || CSS || — || align=right | 2.0 km || 
|-id=736 bgcolor=#E9E9E9
| 417736 ||  || — || February 13, 2007 || Mount Lemmon || Mount Lemmon Survey || — || align=right | 1.1 km || 
|-id=737 bgcolor=#E9E9E9
| 417737 ||  || — || February 10, 2007 || Catalina || CSS || — || align=right | 2.0 km || 
|-id=738 bgcolor=#E9E9E9
| 417738 ||  || — || February 15, 2007 || Palomar || NEAT || — || align=right | 1.1 km || 
|-id=739 bgcolor=#d6d6d6
| 417739 ||  || — || October 26, 2005 || Kitt Peak || Spacewatch || — || align=right | 3.7 km || 
|-id=740 bgcolor=#E9E9E9
| 417740 ||  || — || February 14, 2007 || Mauna Kea || Mauna Kea Obs. || — || align=right | 1.3 km || 
|-id=741 bgcolor=#E9E9E9
| 417741 ||  || — || October 1, 2005 || Kitt Peak || Spacewatch || — || align=right | 1.2 km || 
|-id=742 bgcolor=#fefefe
| 417742 || 2007 DG || — || February 16, 2007 || Mayhill || A. Lowe || H || align=right | 1.1 km || 
|-id=743 bgcolor=#E9E9E9
| 417743 ||  || — || February 16, 2007 || Mount Lemmon || Mount Lemmon Survey || — || align=right data-sort-value="0.80" | 800 m || 
|-id=744 bgcolor=#E9E9E9
| 417744 ||  || — || February 17, 2007 || Kitt Peak || Spacewatch || — || align=right | 2.0 km || 
|-id=745 bgcolor=#E9E9E9
| 417745 ||  || — || December 20, 2006 || Mount Lemmon || Mount Lemmon Survey || — || align=right | 3.8 km || 
|-id=746 bgcolor=#E9E9E9
| 417746 ||  || — || October 27, 2006 || Mount Lemmon || Mount Lemmon Survey || — || align=right | 1.5 km || 
|-id=747 bgcolor=#E9E9E9
| 417747 ||  || — || February 17, 2007 || Kitt Peak || Spacewatch || — || align=right | 1.4 km || 
|-id=748 bgcolor=#E9E9E9
| 417748 ||  || — || February 17, 2007 || Kitt Peak || Spacewatch || — || align=right | 2.0 km || 
|-id=749 bgcolor=#E9E9E9
| 417749 ||  || — || February 17, 2007 || Kitt Peak || Spacewatch || — || align=right | 1.2 km || 
|-id=750 bgcolor=#E9E9E9
| 417750 ||  || — || January 28, 2007 || Mount Lemmon || Mount Lemmon Survey || — || align=right | 1.8 km || 
|-id=751 bgcolor=#E9E9E9
| 417751 ||  || — || February 19, 2007 || Kitt Peak || Spacewatch || — || align=right | 2.2 km || 
|-id=752 bgcolor=#E9E9E9
| 417752 ||  || — || February 19, 2007 || Mount Lemmon || Mount Lemmon Survey || — || align=right | 1.8 km || 
|-id=753 bgcolor=#E9E9E9
| 417753 ||  || — || February 17, 2007 || Mount Lemmon || Mount Lemmon Survey || EUN || align=right data-sort-value="0.93" | 930 m || 
|-id=754 bgcolor=#E9E9E9
| 417754 ||  || — || January 25, 2007 || Kitt Peak || Spacewatch || — || align=right data-sort-value="0.86" | 860 m || 
|-id=755 bgcolor=#E9E9E9
| 417755 ||  || — || December 13, 2006 || Kitt Peak || Spacewatch || — || align=right | 1.4 km || 
|-id=756 bgcolor=#C2FFFF
| 417756 ||  || — || February 21, 2007 || Mount Lemmon || Mount Lemmon Survey || L5 || align=right | 10 km || 
|-id=757 bgcolor=#E9E9E9
| 417757 ||  || — || February 16, 2007 || Catalina || CSS || — || align=right data-sort-value="0.85" | 850 m || 
|-id=758 bgcolor=#E9E9E9
| 417758 ||  || — || February 6, 2007 || Kitt Peak || Spacewatch || — || align=right | 2.2 km || 
|-id=759 bgcolor=#E9E9E9
| 417759 ||  || — || January 28, 2007 || Mount Lemmon || Mount Lemmon Survey || — || align=right | 1.3 km || 
|-id=760 bgcolor=#E9E9E9
| 417760 ||  || — || February 21, 2007 || Mount Lemmon || Mount Lemmon Survey || — || align=right | 1.6 km || 
|-id=761 bgcolor=#E9E9E9
| 417761 ||  || — || February 22, 2007 || Anderson Mesa || LONEOS || — || align=right | 2.0 km || 
|-id=762 bgcolor=#E9E9E9
| 417762 ||  || — || February 21, 2007 || Kitt Peak || Spacewatch || — || align=right data-sort-value="0.76" | 760 m || 
|-id=763 bgcolor=#E9E9E9
| 417763 ||  || — || February 21, 2007 || Kitt Peak || Spacewatch || — || align=right | 1.2 km || 
|-id=764 bgcolor=#E9E9E9
| 417764 ||  || — || February 25, 2007 || Mount Lemmon || Mount Lemmon Survey || — || align=right | 1.5 km || 
|-id=765 bgcolor=#E9E9E9
| 417765 ||  || — || February 23, 2007 || Kitt Peak || Spacewatch || — || align=right | 2.1 km || 
|-id=766 bgcolor=#E9E9E9
| 417766 ||  || — || February 23, 2007 || Kitt Peak || Spacewatch || NEM || align=right | 2.1 km || 
|-id=767 bgcolor=#C2FFFF
| 417767 ||  || — || February 23, 2007 || Kitt Peak || Spacewatch || L5 || align=right | 7.6 km || 
|-id=768 bgcolor=#E9E9E9
| 417768 ||  || — || February 26, 2007 || Mount Lemmon || Mount Lemmon Survey || — || align=right data-sort-value="0.77" | 770 m || 
|-id=769 bgcolor=#E9E9E9
| 417769 ||  || — || February 16, 2007 || Catalina || CSS || — || align=right | 1.9 km || 
|-id=770 bgcolor=#d6d6d6
| 417770 ||  || — || February 25, 2007 || Kitt Peak || Spacewatch || — || align=right | 4.9 km || 
|-id=771 bgcolor=#E9E9E9
| 417771 ||  || — || February 19, 2007 || Catalina || CSS || — || align=right | 1.7 km || 
|-id=772 bgcolor=#E9E9E9
| 417772 ||  || — || February 23, 2007 || Mount Lemmon || Mount Lemmon Survey || — || align=right | 2.5 km || 
|-id=773 bgcolor=#E9E9E9
| 417773 ||  || — || February 25, 2007 || Mount Lemmon || Mount Lemmon Survey || — || align=right | 1.7 km || 
|-id=774 bgcolor=#E9E9E9
| 417774 ||  || — || March 10, 2003 || Campo Imperatore || CINEOS || — || align=right data-sort-value="0.81" | 810 m || 
|-id=775 bgcolor=#E9E9E9
| 417775 ||  || — || March 9, 2007 || Mount Lemmon || Mount Lemmon Survey || — || align=right | 1.9 km || 
|-id=776 bgcolor=#E9E9E9
| 417776 ||  || — || March 9, 2007 || Mount Lemmon || Mount Lemmon Survey || — || align=right | 1.6 km || 
|-id=777 bgcolor=#E9E9E9
| 417777 ||  || — || March 9, 2007 || Palomar || NEAT || — || align=right | 1.7 km || 
|-id=778 bgcolor=#E9E9E9
| 417778 ||  || — || February 25, 2007 || Mount Lemmon || Mount Lemmon Survey || — || align=right | 1.3 km || 
|-id=779 bgcolor=#d6d6d6
| 417779 ||  || — || March 10, 2007 || Mount Lemmon || Mount Lemmon Survey || — || align=right | 2.9 km || 
|-id=780 bgcolor=#E9E9E9
| 417780 ||  || — || March 10, 2007 || Kitt Peak || Spacewatch || — || align=right | 2.1 km || 
|-id=781 bgcolor=#E9E9E9
| 417781 ||  || — || March 10, 2007 || Mount Lemmon || Mount Lemmon Survey || — || align=right data-sort-value="0.93" | 930 m || 
|-id=782 bgcolor=#d6d6d6
| 417782 ||  || — || March 11, 2007 || Kitt Peak || Spacewatch || — || align=right | 2.6 km || 
|-id=783 bgcolor=#E9E9E9
| 417783 ||  || — || March 23, 2003 || Kitt Peak || Spacewatch || — || align=right | 1.3 km || 
|-id=784 bgcolor=#E9E9E9
| 417784 ||  || — || March 9, 2007 || Mount Lemmon || Mount Lemmon Survey || — || align=right | 2.3 km || 
|-id=785 bgcolor=#E9E9E9
| 417785 ||  || — || March 9, 2007 || Mount Lemmon || Mount Lemmon Survey || — || align=right data-sort-value="0.86" | 860 m || 
|-id=786 bgcolor=#E9E9E9
| 417786 ||  || — || March 10, 2007 || Kitt Peak || Spacewatch || — || align=right | 2.8 km || 
|-id=787 bgcolor=#E9E9E9
| 417787 ||  || — || March 10, 2007 || Mount Lemmon || Mount Lemmon Survey || — || align=right | 1.6 km || 
|-id=788 bgcolor=#E9E9E9
| 417788 ||  || — || February 26, 2007 || Mount Lemmon || Mount Lemmon Survey || — || align=right | 2.8 km || 
|-id=789 bgcolor=#E9E9E9
| 417789 ||  || — || March 10, 2007 || Kitt Peak || Spacewatch || — || align=right | 2.1 km || 
|-id=790 bgcolor=#E9E9E9
| 417790 ||  || — || March 13, 2007 || Kitt Peak || Spacewatch || — || align=right | 2.3 km || 
|-id=791 bgcolor=#E9E9E9
| 417791 ||  || — || March 9, 2007 || Mount Lemmon || Mount Lemmon Survey || — || align=right | 2.6 km || 
|-id=792 bgcolor=#E9E9E9
| 417792 ||  || — || March 10, 2007 || Mount Lemmon || Mount Lemmon Survey || — || align=right | 2.2 km || 
|-id=793 bgcolor=#d6d6d6
| 417793 ||  || — || March 11, 2007 || Kitt Peak || Spacewatch || — || align=right | 2.6 km || 
|-id=794 bgcolor=#E9E9E9
| 417794 ||  || — || March 13, 2007 || Mount Lemmon || Mount Lemmon Survey || — || align=right | 2.5 km || 
|-id=795 bgcolor=#E9E9E9
| 417795 ||  || — || March 14, 2007 || Anderson Mesa || LONEOS || — || align=right | 2.3 km || 
|-id=796 bgcolor=#E9E9E9
| 417796 ||  || — || December 27, 2006 || Mount Lemmon || Mount Lemmon Survey || EUN || align=right | 1.4 km || 
|-id=797 bgcolor=#E9E9E9
| 417797 ||  || — || March 9, 2007 || Mount Lemmon || Mount Lemmon Survey || — || align=right | 1.9 km || 
|-id=798 bgcolor=#E9E9E9
| 417798 ||  || — || March 9, 2007 || Mount Lemmon || Mount Lemmon Survey || AGN || align=right | 1.2 km || 
|-id=799 bgcolor=#E9E9E9
| 417799 ||  || — || December 15, 2006 || Mount Lemmon || Mount Lemmon Survey || JUN || align=right | 1.2 km || 
|-id=800 bgcolor=#E9E9E9
| 417800 ||  || — || December 23, 2006 || Mount Lemmon || Mount Lemmon Survey || — || align=right data-sort-value="0.78" | 780 m || 
|}

417801–417900 

|-bgcolor=#E9E9E9
| 417801 ||  || — || March 12, 2007 || Mount Lemmon || Mount Lemmon Survey || — || align=right | 1.9 km || 
|-id=802 bgcolor=#E9E9E9
| 417802 ||  || — || March 12, 2007 || Kitt Peak || Spacewatch || AGN || align=right | 1.6 km || 
|-id=803 bgcolor=#E9E9E9
| 417803 ||  || — || March 11, 2007 || Catalina || CSS || — || align=right | 1.1 km || 
|-id=804 bgcolor=#E9E9E9
| 417804 ||  || — || February 19, 2007 || Mount Lemmon || Mount Lemmon Survey || (5) || align=right data-sort-value="0.81" | 810 m || 
|-id=805 bgcolor=#E9E9E9
| 417805 ||  || — || March 14, 2007 || Kitt Peak || Spacewatch || — || align=right | 2.4 km || 
|-id=806 bgcolor=#E9E9E9
| 417806 ||  || — || November 21, 2006 || Mount Lemmon || Mount Lemmon Survey || (5) || align=right data-sort-value="0.69" | 690 m || 
|-id=807 bgcolor=#E9E9E9
| 417807 ||  || — || March 15, 2007 || Catalina || CSS || — || align=right | 2.7 km || 
|-id=808 bgcolor=#E9E9E9
| 417808 ||  || — || March 14, 2007 || Kitt Peak || Spacewatch || GEF || align=right | 1.4 km || 
|-id=809 bgcolor=#E9E9E9
| 417809 ||  || — || March 14, 2007 || Mount Lemmon || Mount Lemmon Survey || — || align=right | 1.3 km || 
|-id=810 bgcolor=#E9E9E9
| 417810 ||  || — || March 12, 2007 || Kitt Peak || Spacewatch || — || align=right | 1.9 km || 
|-id=811 bgcolor=#E9E9E9
| 417811 ||  || — || March 12, 2007 || Mount Lemmon || Mount Lemmon Survey || — || align=right | 1.5 km || 
|-id=812 bgcolor=#E9E9E9
| 417812 ||  || — || March 8, 2007 || Palomar || NEAT || — || align=right | 1.3 km || 
|-id=813 bgcolor=#E9E9E9
| 417813 ||  || — || November 17, 2006 || Kitt Peak || Spacewatch || — || align=right | 2.9 km || 
|-id=814 bgcolor=#E9E9E9
| 417814 ||  || — || March 14, 2007 || Anderson Mesa || LONEOS || — || align=right | 1.9 km || 
|-id=815 bgcolor=#E9E9E9
| 417815 ||  || — || March 11, 2007 || Mount Lemmon || Mount Lemmon Survey || — || align=right | 1.5 km || 
|-id=816 bgcolor=#FFC2E0
| 417816 ||  || — || March 16, 2007 || Catalina || CSS || APOPHA || align=right data-sort-value="0.31" | 310 m || 
|-id=817 bgcolor=#E9E9E9
| 417817 ||  || — || December 15, 2006 || Mount Lemmon || Mount Lemmon Survey || — || align=right | 4.0 km || 
|-id=818 bgcolor=#E9E9E9
| 417818 ||  || — || March 17, 2007 || Kitt Peak || Spacewatch || — || align=right | 1.1 km || 
|-id=819 bgcolor=#E9E9E9
| 417819 ||  || — || March 11, 2007 || Catalina || CSS || — || align=right | 1.5 km || 
|-id=820 bgcolor=#E9E9E9
| 417820 ||  || — || March 24, 2007 || Bergisch Gladbach || W. Bickel || — || align=right | 1.5 km || 
|-id=821 bgcolor=#E9E9E9
| 417821 ||  || — || March 20, 2007 || Kitt Peak || Spacewatch || — || align=right | 2.2 km || 
|-id=822 bgcolor=#E9E9E9
| 417822 ||  || — || March 20, 2007 || Kitt Peak || Spacewatch || — || align=right | 2.1 km || 
|-id=823 bgcolor=#E9E9E9
| 417823 ||  || — || March 20, 2007 || Mount Lemmon || Mount Lemmon Survey || AGN || align=right | 1.2 km || 
|-id=824 bgcolor=#E9E9E9
| 417824 ||  || — || March 20, 2007 || Socorro || LINEAR || — || align=right | 2.3 km || 
|-id=825 bgcolor=#d6d6d6
| 417825 ||  || — || March 20, 2007 || Kitt Peak || Spacewatch || — || align=right | 2.4 km || 
|-id=826 bgcolor=#E9E9E9
| 417826 ||  || — || March 25, 2007 || Mount Lemmon || Mount Lemmon Survey || — || align=right | 2.5 km || 
|-id=827 bgcolor=#E9E9E9
| 417827 ||  || — || March 20, 2007 || Catalina || CSS || — || align=right | 1.2 km || 
|-id=828 bgcolor=#E9E9E9
| 417828 ||  || — || March 19, 2007 || Mount Lemmon || Mount Lemmon Survey || — || align=right | 2.4 km || 
|-id=829 bgcolor=#C2FFFF
| 417829 ||  || — || January 28, 2006 || Kitt Peak || Spacewatch || L5 || align=right | 7.7 km || 
|-id=830 bgcolor=#C2FFFF
| 417830 ||  || — || March 20, 2007 || Mount Lemmon || Mount Lemmon Survey || L5 || align=right | 8.2 km || 
|-id=831 bgcolor=#E9E9E9
| 417831 ||  || — || March 26, 2007 || Catalina || CSS || EUN || align=right | 1.4 km || 
|-id=832 bgcolor=#E9E9E9
| 417832 ||  || — || March 26, 2007 || Catalina || CSS || — || align=right | 3.4 km || 
|-id=833 bgcolor=#E9E9E9
| 417833 ||  || — || April 7, 2007 || Catalina || CSS || — || align=right | 2.8 km || 
|-id=834 bgcolor=#E9E9E9
| 417834 ||  || — || March 25, 2007 || Mount Lemmon || Mount Lemmon Survey || — || align=right | 2.8 km || 
|-id=835 bgcolor=#E9E9E9
| 417835 ||  || — || February 21, 2007 || Mount Lemmon || Mount Lemmon Survey || GEF || align=right | 1.2 km || 
|-id=836 bgcolor=#E9E9E9
| 417836 ||  || — || April 14, 2007 || Kitt Peak || Spacewatch || — || align=right | 1.3 km || 
|-id=837 bgcolor=#E9E9E9
| 417837 ||  || — || April 14, 2007 || Mount Lemmon || Mount Lemmon Survey || — || align=right | 1.4 km || 
|-id=838 bgcolor=#d6d6d6
| 417838 ||  || — || March 15, 2007 || Kitt Peak || Spacewatch || NAE || align=right | 2.3 km || 
|-id=839 bgcolor=#E9E9E9
| 417839 ||  || — || April 15, 2007 || Kitt Peak || Spacewatch || EUN || align=right | 1.5 km || 
|-id=840 bgcolor=#E9E9E9
| 417840 ||  || — || April 15, 2007 || Catalina || CSS || — || align=right | 1.0 km || 
|-id=841 bgcolor=#E9E9E9
| 417841 ||  || — || April 7, 2007 || Catalina || CSS || EUN || align=right | 1.6 km || 
|-id=842 bgcolor=#E9E9E9
| 417842 ||  || — || April 11, 2007 || Catalina || CSS || — || align=right | 2.6 km || 
|-id=843 bgcolor=#E9E9E9
| 417843 ||  || — || April 16, 2007 || Catalina || CSS || — || align=right | 2.1 km || 
|-id=844 bgcolor=#C2FFFF
| 417844 ||  || — || April 18, 2007 || Mount Lemmon || Mount Lemmon Survey || L5 || align=right | 7.4 km || 
|-id=845 bgcolor=#E9E9E9
| 417845 ||  || — || April 19, 2007 || Kitt Peak || Spacewatch || — || align=right | 2.1 km || 
|-id=846 bgcolor=#d6d6d6
| 417846 ||  || — || April 20, 2007 || Kitt Peak || Spacewatch || — || align=right | 2.0 km || 
|-id=847 bgcolor=#d6d6d6
| 417847 ||  || — || April 20, 2007 || Kitt Peak || Spacewatch || — || align=right | 3.5 km || 
|-id=848 bgcolor=#d6d6d6
| 417848 ||  || — || April 20, 2007 || Kitt Peak || Spacewatch || — || align=right | 2.8 km || 
|-id=849 bgcolor=#d6d6d6
| 417849 ||  || — || April 22, 2007 || Mount Lemmon || Mount Lemmon Survey || — || align=right | 2.4 km || 
|-id=850 bgcolor=#d6d6d6
| 417850 ||  || — || April 23, 2007 || Catalina || CSS || — || align=right | 3.0 km || 
|-id=851 bgcolor=#E9E9E9
| 417851 ||  || — || April 20, 2007 || Kitt Peak || Spacewatch || — || align=right | 2.0 km || 
|-id=852 bgcolor=#E9E9E9
| 417852 ||  || — || April 20, 2007 || Kitt Peak || Spacewatch || DOR || align=right | 2.2 km || 
|-id=853 bgcolor=#d6d6d6
| 417853 ||  || — || April 20, 2007 || Kitt Peak || Spacewatch || BRA || align=right | 1.6 km || 
|-id=854 bgcolor=#d6d6d6
| 417854 ||  || — || April 25, 2007 || Mount Lemmon || Mount Lemmon Survey || — || align=right | 2.7 km || 
|-id=855 bgcolor=#d6d6d6
| 417855 ||  || — || May 7, 2007 || Mount Lemmon || Mount Lemmon Survey || — || align=right | 4.9 km || 
|-id=856 bgcolor=#d6d6d6
| 417856 || 2007 JZ || — || May 6, 2007 || Purple Mountain || PMO NEO || Tj (2.96) || align=right | 4.3 km || 
|-id=857 bgcolor=#E9E9E9
| 417857 ||  || — || May 9, 2007 || Catalina || CSS || — || align=right | 1.4 km || 
|-id=858 bgcolor=#E9E9E9
| 417858 ||  || — || March 14, 2007 || Mount Lemmon || Mount Lemmon Survey || — || align=right | 2.7 km || 
|-id=859 bgcolor=#d6d6d6
| 417859 ||  || — || May 7, 2007 || Kitt Peak || Spacewatch || — || align=right | 4.1 km || 
|-id=860 bgcolor=#E9E9E9
| 417860 ||  || — || May 10, 2007 || Goodricke-Pigott || R. A. Tucker || — || align=right | 2.5 km || 
|-id=861 bgcolor=#d6d6d6
| 417861 ||  || — || April 25, 2007 || Mount Lemmon || Mount Lemmon Survey || — || align=right | 2.8 km || 
|-id=862 bgcolor=#E9E9E9
| 417862 ||  || — || April 25, 2007 || Mount Lemmon || Mount Lemmon Survey || — || align=right | 1.9 km || 
|-id=863 bgcolor=#d6d6d6
| 417863 ||  || — || May 12, 2007 || Mount Lemmon || Mount Lemmon Survey || — || align=right | 3.2 km || 
|-id=864 bgcolor=#E9E9E9
| 417864 ||  || — || March 25, 2007 || Mount Lemmon || Mount Lemmon Survey || — || align=right | 1.9 km || 
|-id=865 bgcolor=#E9E9E9
| 417865 ||  || — || March 25, 2007 || Mount Lemmon || Mount Lemmon Survey || — || align=right | 2.0 km || 
|-id=866 bgcolor=#d6d6d6
| 417866 ||  || — || June 8, 2007 || Kitt Peak || Spacewatch || — || align=right | 6.1 km || 
|-id=867 bgcolor=#E9E9E9
| 417867 ||  || — || June 16, 2007 || Siding Spring || SSS || — || align=right | 2.5 km || 
|-id=868 bgcolor=#d6d6d6
| 417868 ||  || — || June 16, 2007 || Kitt Peak || Spacewatch || — || align=right | 4.0 km || 
|-id=869 bgcolor=#d6d6d6
| 417869 ||  || — || June 16, 2007 || Kitt Peak || Spacewatch || — || align=right | 3.7 km || 
|-id=870 bgcolor=#d6d6d6
| 417870 ||  || — || June 19, 2007 || Kitt Peak || Spacewatch || Tj (2.99) || align=right | 3.6 km || 
|-id=871 bgcolor=#FFC2E0
| 417871 ||  || — || June 24, 2007 || Socorro || LINEAR || APO +1kmPHA || align=right data-sort-value="0.81" | 810 m || 
|-id=872 bgcolor=#d6d6d6
| 417872 ||  || — || July 8, 2007 || Reedy Creek || J. Broughton || — || align=right | 4.1 km || 
|-id=873 bgcolor=#fefefe
| 417873 ||  || — || July 14, 2007 || Dauban || Chante-Perdrix Obs. || — || align=right data-sort-value="0.83" | 830 m || 
|-id=874 bgcolor=#FFC2E0
| 417874 ||  || — || July 4, 2007 || Mount Lemmon || Mount Lemmon Survey || APO +1kmcritical || align=right data-sort-value="0.85" | 850 m || 
|-id=875 bgcolor=#d6d6d6
| 417875 ||  || — || July 18, 2007 || Socorro || LINEAR || — || align=right | 8.5 km || 
|-id=876 bgcolor=#fefefe
| 417876 ||  || — || August 10, 2007 || Reedy Creek || J. Broughton || — || align=right data-sort-value="0.79" | 790 m || 
|-id=877 bgcolor=#fefefe
| 417877 ||  || — || August 9, 2007 || Kitt Peak || Spacewatch || — || align=right data-sort-value="0.66" | 660 m || 
|-id=878 bgcolor=#fefefe
| 417878 ||  || — || August 9, 2007 || Socorro || LINEAR || — || align=right data-sort-value="0.73" | 730 m || 
|-id=879 bgcolor=#d6d6d6
| 417879 ||  || — || August 12, 2007 || Socorro || LINEAR || — || align=right | 4.0 km || 
|-id=880 bgcolor=#fefefe
| 417880 ||  || — || August 11, 2007 || Socorro || LINEAR || — || align=right data-sort-value="0.85" | 850 m || 
|-id=881 bgcolor=#fefefe
| 417881 ||  || — || August 10, 2007 || Kitt Peak || Spacewatch || — || align=right data-sort-value="0.58" | 580 m || 
|-id=882 bgcolor=#E9E9E9
| 417882 ||  || — || August 11, 2007 || Siding Spring || SSS || — || align=right | 1.8 km || 
|-id=883 bgcolor=#d6d6d6
| 417883 ||  || — || August 23, 2007 || Andrushivka || Andrushivka Obs. || — || align=right | 4.1 km || 
|-id=884 bgcolor=#fefefe
| 417884 ||  || — || August 21, 2007 || Bisei SG Center || BATTeRS || — || align=right data-sort-value="0.87" | 870 m || 
|-id=885 bgcolor=#fefefe
| 417885 ||  || — || August 16, 2007 || Socorro || LINEAR || — || align=right data-sort-value="0.73" | 730 m || 
|-id=886 bgcolor=#fefefe
| 417886 ||  || — || August 13, 2007 || Socorro || LINEAR || — || align=right data-sort-value="0.84" | 840 m || 
|-id=887 bgcolor=#fefefe
| 417887 ||  || — || September 7, 2007 || Socorro || LINEAR || — || align=right data-sort-value="0.64" | 640 m || 
|-id=888 bgcolor=#fefefe
| 417888 ||  || — || September 10, 2007 || Dauban || Chante-Perdrix Obs. || — || align=right | 1.1 km || 
|-id=889 bgcolor=#d6d6d6
| 417889 ||  || — || September 2, 2007 || Catalina || CSS || — || align=right | 5.1 km || 
|-id=890 bgcolor=#fefefe
| 417890 ||  || — || September 4, 2007 || Mount Lemmon || Mount Lemmon Survey || — || align=right data-sort-value="0.50" | 500 m || 
|-id=891 bgcolor=#d6d6d6
| 417891 ||  || — || September 5, 2007 || Catalina || CSS || — || align=right | 3.8 km || 
|-id=892 bgcolor=#fefefe
| 417892 ||  || — || September 6, 2007 || Anderson Mesa || LONEOS || — || align=right data-sort-value="0.52" | 520 m || 
|-id=893 bgcolor=#fefefe
| 417893 ||  || — || September 8, 2007 || Anderson Mesa || LONEOS || — || align=right data-sort-value="0.76" | 760 m || 
|-id=894 bgcolor=#FA8072
| 417894 ||  || — || September 9, 2007 || Kitt Peak || Spacewatch || — || align=right data-sort-value="0.64" | 640 m || 
|-id=895 bgcolor=#fefefe
| 417895 ||  || — || September 9, 2007 || Kitt Peak || Spacewatch || V || align=right data-sort-value="0.75" | 750 m || 
|-id=896 bgcolor=#d6d6d6
| 417896 ||  || — || September 9, 2007 || Kitt Peak || Spacewatch || — || align=right | 3.1 km || 
|-id=897 bgcolor=#fefefe
| 417897 ||  || — || September 9, 2007 || Kitt Peak || Spacewatch || — || align=right data-sort-value="0.87" | 870 m || 
|-id=898 bgcolor=#fefefe
| 417898 ||  || — || September 10, 2007 || Mount Lemmon || Mount Lemmon Survey || — || align=right data-sort-value="0.76" | 760 m || 
|-id=899 bgcolor=#fefefe
| 417899 ||  || — || September 10, 2007 || Kitt Peak || Spacewatch || — || align=right data-sort-value="0.77" | 770 m || 
|-id=900 bgcolor=#d6d6d6
| 417900 ||  || — || September 11, 2007 || Catalina || CSS || — || align=right | 3.9 km || 
|}

417901–418000 

|-bgcolor=#fefefe
| 417901 ||  || — || September 11, 2007 || Catalina || CSS || — || align=right data-sort-value="0.67" | 670 m || 
|-id=902 bgcolor=#d6d6d6
| 417902 ||  || — || August 24, 2001 || Kitt Peak || Spacewatch || — || align=right | 2.9 km || 
|-id=903 bgcolor=#fefefe
| 417903 ||  || — || September 11, 2007 || Mount Lemmon || Mount Lemmon Survey || — || align=right data-sort-value="0.59" | 590 m || 
|-id=904 bgcolor=#d6d6d6
| 417904 ||  || — || September 11, 2007 || Kitt Peak || Spacewatch || — || align=right | 2.9 km || 
|-id=905 bgcolor=#d6d6d6
| 417905 ||  || — || September 14, 2007 || Mount Lemmon || Mount Lemmon Survey || — || align=right | 3.4 km || 
|-id=906 bgcolor=#fefefe
| 417906 ||  || — || October 23, 1997 || Kitt Peak || Spacewatch || — || align=right data-sort-value="0.56" | 560 m || 
|-id=907 bgcolor=#fefefe
| 417907 ||  || — || September 12, 2007 || Mount Lemmon || Mount Lemmon Survey || — || align=right data-sort-value="0.72" | 720 m || 
|-id=908 bgcolor=#fefefe
| 417908 ||  || — || September 11, 2007 || Mount Lemmon || Mount Lemmon Survey || (2076) || align=right data-sort-value="0.87" | 870 m || 
|-id=909 bgcolor=#fefefe
| 417909 ||  || — || August 23, 2007 || Kitt Peak || Spacewatch || — || align=right data-sort-value="0.64" | 640 m || 
|-id=910 bgcolor=#fefefe
| 417910 ||  || — || September 14, 2007 || Socorro || LINEAR || — || align=right | 1.1 km || 
|-id=911 bgcolor=#fefefe
| 417911 ||  || — || September 12, 2007 || Catalina || CSS || — || align=right | 1.0 km || 
|-id=912 bgcolor=#fefefe
| 417912 ||  || — || September 11, 2007 || XuYi || PMO NEO || — || align=right data-sort-value="0.86" | 860 m || 
|-id=913 bgcolor=#fefefe
| 417913 ||  || — || September 12, 2007 || Catalina || CSS || — || align=right data-sort-value="0.80" | 800 m || 
|-id=914 bgcolor=#fefefe
| 417914 ||  || — || September 10, 2007 || Kitt Peak || Spacewatch || V || align=right data-sort-value="0.50" | 500 m || 
|-id=915 bgcolor=#d6d6d6
| 417915 ||  || — || September 10, 2007 || Kitt Peak || Spacewatch || — || align=right | 3.4 km || 
|-id=916 bgcolor=#fefefe
| 417916 ||  || — || September 13, 2007 || Kitt Peak || Spacewatch || — || align=right data-sort-value="0.61" | 610 m || 
|-id=917 bgcolor=#fefefe
| 417917 ||  || — || September 13, 2007 || Kitt Peak || Spacewatch || — || align=right data-sort-value="0.65" | 650 m || 
|-id=918 bgcolor=#fefefe
| 417918 ||  || — || September 9, 2007 || Kitt Peak || Spacewatch || — || align=right data-sort-value="0.83" | 830 m || 
|-id=919 bgcolor=#fefefe
| 417919 ||  || — || September 8, 2007 || Anderson Mesa || LONEOS || NYS || align=right data-sort-value="0.70" | 700 m || 
|-id=920 bgcolor=#fefefe
| 417920 ||  || — || September 12, 2007 || Kitt Peak || Spacewatch || — || align=right data-sort-value="0.71" | 710 m || 
|-id=921 bgcolor=#d6d6d6
| 417921 ||  || — || September 12, 2007 || Kitt Peak || Spacewatch || 7:4 || align=right | 3.4 km || 
|-id=922 bgcolor=#fefefe
| 417922 ||  || — || September 14, 2007 || Mount Lemmon || Mount Lemmon Survey || — || align=right data-sort-value="0.74" | 740 m || 
|-id=923 bgcolor=#fefefe
| 417923 ||  || — || September 12, 2007 || Catalina || CSS || — || align=right data-sort-value="0.83" | 830 m || 
|-id=924 bgcolor=#fefefe
| 417924 ||  || — || August 16, 2007 || XuYi || PMO NEO || — || align=right data-sort-value="0.80" | 800 m || 
|-id=925 bgcolor=#fefefe
| 417925 ||  || — || September 11, 2007 || Kitt Peak || Spacewatch || — || align=right data-sort-value="0.67" | 670 m || 
|-id=926 bgcolor=#fefefe
| 417926 ||  || — || September 15, 2007 || Kitt Peak || Spacewatch || — || align=right data-sort-value="0.67" | 670 m || 
|-id=927 bgcolor=#d6d6d6
| 417927 ||  || — || September 5, 2007 || Catalina || CSS || — || align=right | 3.4 km || 
|-id=928 bgcolor=#fefefe
| 417928 ||  || — || September 15, 2007 || Mount Lemmon || Mount Lemmon Survey || — || align=right data-sort-value="0.96" | 960 m || 
|-id=929 bgcolor=#fefefe
| 417929 ||  || — || September 10, 2007 || Mount Lemmon || Mount Lemmon Survey || — || align=right data-sort-value="0.76" | 760 m || 
|-id=930 bgcolor=#d6d6d6
| 417930 ||  || — || September 14, 2007 || Mount Lemmon || Mount Lemmon Survey || 7:4 || align=right | 4.6 km || 
|-id=931 bgcolor=#fefefe
| 417931 ||  || — || September 13, 2007 || Mount Lemmon || Mount Lemmon Survey || — || align=right data-sort-value="0.62" | 620 m || 
|-id=932 bgcolor=#fefefe
| 417932 ||  || — || September 10, 2007 || Mount Lemmon || Mount Lemmon Survey || (2076) || align=right data-sort-value="0.67" | 670 m || 
|-id=933 bgcolor=#fefefe
| 417933 ||  || — || September 9, 2007 || Kitt Peak || Spacewatch || — || align=right data-sort-value="0.61" | 610 m || 
|-id=934 bgcolor=#fefefe
| 417934 ||  || — || September 12, 2007 || Catalina || CSS || — || align=right data-sort-value="0.74" | 740 m || 
|-id=935 bgcolor=#fefefe
| 417935 ||  || — || September 8, 2007 || Anderson Mesa || LONEOS || — || align=right data-sort-value="0.74" | 740 m || 
|-id=936 bgcolor=#fefefe
| 417936 ||  || — || September 11, 2007 || XuYi || PMO NEO || — || align=right data-sort-value="0.62" | 620 m || 
|-id=937 bgcolor=#fefefe
| 417937 ||  || — || September 12, 2007 || Catalina || CSS || — || align=right data-sort-value="0.75" | 750 m || 
|-id=938 bgcolor=#fefefe
| 417938 ||  || — || September 15, 2007 || Mount Lemmon || Mount Lemmon Survey || — || align=right data-sort-value="0.88" | 880 m || 
|-id=939 bgcolor=#fefefe
| 417939 ||  || — || September 16, 2007 || Socorro || LINEAR || — || align=right | 1.1 km || 
|-id=940 bgcolor=#fefefe
| 417940 ||  || — || September 17, 2007 || Socorro || LINEAR || — || align=right data-sort-value="0.90" | 900 m || 
|-id=941 bgcolor=#fefefe
| 417941 ||  || — || September 18, 2007 || Kitt Peak || Spacewatch || — || align=right data-sort-value="0.84" | 840 m || 
|-id=942 bgcolor=#fefefe
| 417942 ||  || — || September 19, 2007 || Kitt Peak || Spacewatch || — || align=right data-sort-value="0.54" | 540 m || 
|-id=943 bgcolor=#d6d6d6
| 417943 ||  || — || September 19, 2007 || Kitt Peak || Spacewatch || — || align=right | 3.4 km || 
|-id=944 bgcolor=#fefefe
| 417944 ||  || — || September 25, 2007 || Mount Lemmon || Mount Lemmon Survey || — || align=right data-sort-value="0.73" | 730 m || 
|-id=945 bgcolor=#fefefe
| 417945 ||  || — || September 12, 2007 || Mount Lemmon || Mount Lemmon Survey || — || align=right data-sort-value="0.77" | 770 m || 
|-id=946 bgcolor=#fefefe
| 417946 ||  || — || October 6, 2007 || Socorro || LINEAR || — || align=right data-sort-value="0.85" | 850 m || 
|-id=947 bgcolor=#fefefe
| 417947 ||  || — || October 7, 2007 || Črni Vrh || Črni Vrh || — || align=right data-sort-value="0.83" | 830 m || 
|-id=948 bgcolor=#fefefe
| 417948 ||  || — || October 6, 2007 || Socorro || LINEAR || — || align=right data-sort-value="0.92" | 920 m || 
|-id=949 bgcolor=#FFC2E0
| 417949 ||  || — || October 10, 2007 || Catalina || CSS || APOPHA || align=right data-sort-value="0.64" | 640 m || 
|-id=950 bgcolor=#fefefe
| 417950 ||  || — || October 6, 2007 || Kitt Peak || Spacewatch || — || align=right | 1.0 km || 
|-id=951 bgcolor=#fefefe
| 417951 ||  || — || October 4, 2007 || Kitt Peak || Spacewatch || — || align=right | 1.6 km || 
|-id=952 bgcolor=#fefefe
| 417952 ||  || — || September 5, 2007 || Mount Lemmon || Mount Lemmon Survey || — || align=right data-sort-value="0.55" | 550 m || 
|-id=953 bgcolor=#d6d6d6
| 417953 ||  || — || October 12, 2007 || 7300 || W. K. Y. Yeung || 7:4 || align=right | 5.8 km || 
|-id=954 bgcolor=#fefefe
| 417954 ||  || — || October 10, 2007 || Goodricke-Pigott || R. A. Tucker || — || align=right data-sort-value="0.70" | 700 m || 
|-id=955 bgcolor=#d6d6d6
| 417955 Mallama ||  ||  || October 14, 2007 || CBA-NOVAC || D. R. Skillman || 7:4 || align=right | 4.0 km || 
|-id=956 bgcolor=#fefefe
| 417956 ||  || — || October 15, 2007 || Bisei SG Center || BATTeRS || — || align=right data-sort-value="0.94" | 940 m || 
|-id=957 bgcolor=#fefefe
| 417957 ||  || — || October 5, 2007 || Kitt Peak || Spacewatch || — || align=right data-sort-value="0.69" | 690 m || 
|-id=958 bgcolor=#fefefe
| 417958 ||  || — || October 8, 2007 || Mount Lemmon || Mount Lemmon Survey || — || align=right data-sort-value="0.63" | 630 m || 
|-id=959 bgcolor=#fefefe
| 417959 ||  || — || October 8, 2007 || Mount Lemmon || Mount Lemmon Survey || — || align=right | 1.0 km || 
|-id=960 bgcolor=#fefefe
| 417960 ||  || — || October 6, 2007 || Kitt Peak || Spacewatch || — || align=right data-sort-value="0.65" | 650 m || 
|-id=961 bgcolor=#fefefe
| 417961 ||  || — || September 10, 2007 || Mount Lemmon || Mount Lemmon Survey || — || align=right data-sort-value="0.70" | 700 m || 
|-id=962 bgcolor=#fefefe
| 417962 ||  || — || October 6, 2007 || Wise || Wise Obs. || — || align=right data-sort-value="0.88" | 880 m || 
|-id=963 bgcolor=#fefefe
| 417963 ||  || — || September 20, 2007 || Catalina || CSS || — || align=right data-sort-value="0.92" | 920 m || 
|-id=964 bgcolor=#fefefe
| 417964 ||  || — || October 8, 2007 || Anderson Mesa || LONEOS || — || align=right data-sort-value="0.80" | 800 m || 
|-id=965 bgcolor=#fefefe
| 417965 ||  || — || October 8, 2007 || Catalina || CSS || — || align=right data-sort-value="0.67" | 670 m || 
|-id=966 bgcolor=#FA8072
| 417966 ||  || — || October 9, 2007 || Purple Mountain || PMO NEO || — || align=right data-sort-value="0.85" | 850 m || 
|-id=967 bgcolor=#d6d6d6
| 417967 ||  || — || October 5, 2007 || Kitt Peak || Spacewatch || VER || align=right | 2.6 km || 
|-id=968 bgcolor=#fefefe
| 417968 ||  || — || October 6, 2007 || Kitt Peak || Spacewatch || NYS || align=right data-sort-value="0.78" | 780 m || 
|-id=969 bgcolor=#fefefe
| 417969 ||  || — || October 9, 2007 || Mount Lemmon || Mount Lemmon Survey || — || align=right data-sort-value="0.71" | 710 m || 
|-id=970 bgcolor=#d6d6d6
| 417970 ||  || — || September 14, 2007 || Mount Lemmon || Mount Lemmon Survey || 7:4 || align=right | 3.1 km || 
|-id=971 bgcolor=#fefefe
| 417971 ||  || — || October 9, 2007 || Socorro || LINEAR || — || align=right data-sort-value="0.93" | 930 m || 
|-id=972 bgcolor=#fefefe
| 417972 ||  || — || October 9, 2007 || Socorro || LINEAR || — || align=right data-sort-value="0.74" | 740 m || 
|-id=973 bgcolor=#fefefe
| 417973 ||  || — || October 11, 2007 || Socorro || LINEAR || — || align=right data-sort-value="0.88" | 880 m || 
|-id=974 bgcolor=#fefefe
| 417974 ||  || — || October 12, 2007 || Socorro || LINEAR || — || align=right data-sort-value="0.73" | 730 m || 
|-id=975 bgcolor=#fefefe
| 417975 ||  || — || October 12, 2007 || Socorro || LINEAR || — || align=right data-sort-value="0.70" | 700 m || 
|-id=976 bgcolor=#fefefe
| 417976 ||  || — || October 13, 2007 || Socorro || LINEAR || — || align=right data-sort-value="0.92" | 920 m || 
|-id=977 bgcolor=#fefefe
| 417977 ||  || — || September 3, 2000 || Kitt Peak || Spacewatch || — || align=right data-sort-value="0.55" | 550 m || 
|-id=978 bgcolor=#d6d6d6
| 417978 Haslehner ||  ||  || October 13, 2007 || Gaisberg || R. Gierlinger || — || align=right | 3.2 km || 
|-id=979 bgcolor=#fefefe
| 417979 ||  || — || October 13, 2007 || Socorro || LINEAR || — || align=right data-sort-value="0.89" | 890 m || 
|-id=980 bgcolor=#d6d6d6
| 417980 ||  || — || August 24, 2007 || Kitt Peak || Spacewatch || — || align=right | 2.6 km || 
|-id=981 bgcolor=#fefefe
| 417981 ||  || — || October 7, 2007 || Kitt Peak || Spacewatch || — || align=right data-sort-value="0.98" | 980 m || 
|-id=982 bgcolor=#fefefe
| 417982 ||  || — || October 7, 2007 || Kitt Peak || Spacewatch || — || align=right data-sort-value="0.60" | 600 m || 
|-id=983 bgcolor=#fefefe
| 417983 ||  || — || October 7, 2007 || Kitt Peak || Spacewatch || V || align=right data-sort-value="0.64" | 640 m || 
|-id=984 bgcolor=#fefefe
| 417984 ||  || — || October 9, 2007 || Kitt Peak || Spacewatch || — || align=right data-sort-value="0.75" | 750 m || 
|-id=985 bgcolor=#d6d6d6
| 417985 ||  || — || September 5, 2007 || Mount Lemmon || Mount Lemmon Survey || — || align=right | 3.5 km || 
|-id=986 bgcolor=#fefefe
| 417986 ||  || — || September 9, 2007 || Mount Lemmon || Mount Lemmon Survey || — || align=right data-sort-value="0.53" | 530 m || 
|-id=987 bgcolor=#fefefe
| 417987 ||  || — || October 8, 2007 || Kitt Peak || Spacewatch || — || align=right data-sort-value="0.79" | 790 m || 
|-id=988 bgcolor=#fefefe
| 417988 ||  || — || October 11, 2007 || Kitt Peak || Spacewatch || — || align=right data-sort-value="0.78" | 780 m || 
|-id=989 bgcolor=#fefefe
| 417989 ||  || — || October 11, 2007 || Catalina || CSS || — || align=right data-sort-value="0.83" | 830 m || 
|-id=990 bgcolor=#fefefe
| 417990 ||  || — || October 9, 2007 || Mount Lemmon || Mount Lemmon Survey || — || align=right data-sort-value="0.59" | 590 m || 
|-id=991 bgcolor=#fefefe
| 417991 ||  || — || October 12, 2007 || Kitt Peak || Spacewatch || — || align=right data-sort-value="0.70" | 700 m || 
|-id=992 bgcolor=#fefefe
| 417992 ||  || — || October 13, 2007 || Mount Lemmon || Mount Lemmon Survey || — || align=right data-sort-value="0.79" | 790 m || 
|-id=993 bgcolor=#fefefe
| 417993 ||  || — || October 11, 2007 || Lulin Observatory || LUSS || — || align=right data-sort-value="0.58" | 580 m || 
|-id=994 bgcolor=#d6d6d6
| 417994 ||  || — || October 14, 2007 || Mount Lemmon || Mount Lemmon Survey || VER || align=right | 3.4 km || 
|-id=995 bgcolor=#fefefe
| 417995 ||  || — || August 10, 2007 || Kitt Peak || Spacewatch || — || align=right data-sort-value="0.74" | 740 m || 
|-id=996 bgcolor=#d6d6d6
| 417996 ||  || — || August 10, 2007 || Kitt Peak || Spacewatch || — || align=right | 3.4 km || 
|-id=997 bgcolor=#fefefe
| 417997 ||  || — || September 21, 2007 || XuYi || PMO NEO || — || align=right data-sort-value="0.72" | 720 m || 
|-id=998 bgcolor=#fefefe
| 417998 ||  || — || October 14, 2007 || Mount Lemmon || Mount Lemmon Survey || (2076) || align=right data-sort-value="0.62" | 620 m || 
|-id=999 bgcolor=#FA8072
| 417999 ||  || — || October 15, 2007 || Catalina || CSS || — || align=right data-sort-value="0.82" | 820 m || 
|-id=000 bgcolor=#fefefe
| 418000 ||  || — || September 10, 2007 || Mount Lemmon || Mount Lemmon Survey || — || align=right data-sort-value="0.75" | 750 m || 
|}

References

External links 
 Discovery Circumstances: Numbered Minor Planets (415001)–(420000) (IAU Minor Planet Center)

0417